This is a list of characters that were introduced in CBBC's The Dumping Ground. The series is based on The Story of Tracy Beaker by Jacqueline Wilson. It has aired since 2013 and has aired eight series so far. The series follows The Story of Tracy Beaker which ran for five series from 2002 to 2005, and Tracy Beaker Returns which ran for three series from 2010 to 2012. Connor Byrne has played the role of Mike Milligan for all three programmes, although he left in Series 7 Episode 24 to live with his family in Ireland.

Cast

Main characters

Faith Davis

Faith Davis is a resident of Elm Tree House and Ashdene Ridge during the first two series of The Dumping Ground. She is portrayed by Leanne Dunstan. Faith, who shares a room with Elektra while at Elmtree House, is one of the elder children who tries to be responsible, and proves her capabilities and maturity when she acts as a surrogate careworker in the opening episode of The Dumping Ground. She is 16 in series two.

In The Real Faith Davis the police call and the young people suspect something is wrong. All of them start spreading rumours about her being a drug dealer, until Faith tells them the truth. She reveals that the police might have found the body of her brother, Razz, who had been missing. Frank uses this as a way to get more sponsors for her charity run. Faith is disgusted and tells Elektra that she was put in care because she told a teacher that she lived alone, which resulted in them calling social services. The police tell her that the body was not a match; she hides in the garden and finds Floss who helps her gain some composure. The next day she completes her charity run with everyone supporting her. In the second series of The Dumping Ground, after Faith is hit by a car, she is temporarily in a wheelchair, and becomes increasingly negative. This is unlike Faith, as she's very optimistic and ambitious most of the time, but feeling like she was stuck in the wheelchair made her think she'd never run or walk again. She becomes mean and aggressive towards the younger kids mainly, making Harry and Floss to clean her room for a "prize" and ordering them about. She ends up teasing Harry, treating him like a baby. When Faith wants to watch a movie, but Mo, Floss and Harry were already watching something, she tells them to get lost and Mo tells her that she's become really mean, and that he's going to tell Mike. That causes Faith to call Mo a grass. Frank witnesses this and when Faith starts to order Frank about, Frank gives her a piece of his mind by telling her that she's not useless, she's in a wheelchair and she will get better. He then goes on to tell her that he has to talk really slow every day of his life so people can understand him. This changes Faith's recent behaviour and she goes back to her caring and friendly self, but she does have a few snappy and mean moments in later episodes.

Faith is one of the older residents and is tall for her age, with long black hair. She wants to be a distance runner when she grows up, but a car crash incident in "Booting Up" temporarily halts her plans. She left the series following the conclusion to the second series of The Dumping Ground. As of the third series and for one episode, Dunstan returned as Faith. In series 5, Faith does not appear. However, in #SaveTheDG, Tee mentions that Faith made a £50 donation to help keep the 'Dumping Ground' running.

Floss Guppy

Floss Guppy, portrayed by Sarah Rayson, made her first appearance on 1 February 2013 in series 1 of The Dumping Ground during the episode "The Real Faith Davis". She is currently the longest-lasting child to be introduced in The Dumping Ground.

Floss is in care because she was abandoned by her mum in a nail salon, when she was 18 months old. She was very young when she had Floss and couldn't cope. Floss Guppy is good friends with Finn McLaine and Toni and Billie Trent and although initially wary of Harry, even stealing his toy giraffe Jeff, after he unintentionally scared her with stories of the bad things that happened at Elm Tree House as Harry was just trying to give Floss "The Gus Tour", she became good friends with him as well.

Series 1
Floss doesn't appear much or have many major story-lines in Series 1 of The Dumping Ground. She arrives at Elm Tree House midway into the series and meets Harry, who gives him a tour around the house. When they get to Harry's room, Floss is drawn to Jeff and asks to hold him. Harry agrees and tries to get Jeff back from her but she refuses, only agreeing to put him back after the tour is over. During the tour, Harry tells Floss about the bad things that happened (such as Lily falling off the roof and Tee falling out of a tree) which scares her off. She ends up in the garden and comforts Faith (who had gotten news about her brother). Faith convinces Floss to go find Harry after telling her that Harry is a good kid. She reunites with Harry and along with Mike, paint Floss' bedroom to look like the jungle. Floss claims it's for Jeff because he wants to move in. Harry tries to get Jeff back but Floss blackmails him into keeping Jeff by threatening to tell Mike that Harry scared Floss off. He gives up as Floss smirks in victory.

Series 2
In "Kick Off", Floss and Harry decided to continuously take sweets from Tyler's diet plan bucket, after Bailey said Tyler needed to lose weight. Floss was later sick after eating too many sweets.

In "Experience", Carmen used Floss to sabotage Jody's film documentary she was making to new social workers about kids in care. By instead of talking about living in care, Carmen told her to tell Jody the story of "Millie and Bob" which were Floss' sock puppets she made. This didn't go well with Jody.

In "The Barbecue", when Lily tells Carmen that she's moving down to Brighton with her family, to run her step-mum's sister's cafe by the seaside, Carmen kicks Bailey's football quite hard in anger which breaks Johnny's bedroom window. Carmen escapes from the scene, but Bailey hears the window smash and runs to the window. Johnny looks outside his window and sees Bailey standing there. As it's Bailey's football and Johnny and Bailey have a strong rivalry, Johnny automatically accuses Bailey, as does everyone else. Carmen is afraid to confess, but doesn't know that Floss saw her doing it. Later, Mike rings the insurance company to get the window replaced, but when he lets slip that it wasn't an accident, he is told that it's criminal damage. But Mike did not have any intention of involving the police in the situation, and while Mike was on the phone to the insurance company, May-Li was on the other phone at the same time to a repair company to replace to the broken window, and she was told that it could cost a lot of money. Johnny was in the office at the time and was present to hear everything, and decided to call the police himself in private. Before Lily's goodbye barbecue started there was a knock at the door, Mo answered it and was alarmed to see two policemen. They came to arrest Bailey to question him about the window incident. Carmen, again too scared to own up just watched Bailey get arrested and taken to the police station. Later, Floss went to see Carmen in her bedroom to ask if she could look at the "silver dog" (a jewellery locket chain Lily gave to Carmen as a goodbye present, and it looked like Shadow, Lily's dog, although one two many legs and Lily joked.) again, but as Carmen was not in the mood to talk, she told Floss to get out, but Floss interrupted her saying that she saw Carmen smash the window and that she wouldn't tell anyone, if Carmen gave her the silver dog. Carmen, although not wanting too, gave Floss the necklace to keep her quiet, and told her to get out. During the barbecue while Lily was taking pictures of everyone, she noticed Floss was wearing the charm necklace she gave to Carmen. Floss told Lily that Carmen said she hated it and gave it to Floss. Lily went to find Carmen to ask why, and Carmen ended up telling Lily what she did, and that she was the one who smashed the window. Lily is shocked and appalled at Carmen, and says that Bailey was arrested and that Carmen just sat and watched it happen. Carmen then decides to storm off and tell Mike to take her to the police station as she was the one who smashed the window. Later in the garden, May-Li takes Floss to Lily to apologise and give back the necklace to Lily. Lily forgives Floss and says for her to give her a sorry expression on her face for a picture.

In "Be My Girl", Floss meets some prospective parents. She starts to think about her Mother and when a little boy in the park questions her 'Where is your Mum, haven't you got one?' in an evil way, Floss goes over the tipping point and pushes him and his ice cream to the ground. Floss' potential foster parents shout at Floss causing her to get upset. May-Li reveals that Floss is in care because she was abandoned by her mother in a nail salon, when she was 18 months old; this is why she is so attached to nail varnish. At the foster parents' house they ask her to remove her nail varnish causing Floss to throw food around. Floss tells all the people at the 'Dumping Ground' that whilst there is a chance her mum might come back, she will wait.

In Series 3, Floss took up dancing. In "Party Games", during an open day for potential foster parents to get to know the kids in Ashdene Ridge, Floss showed a dance routine to the couples that attended the open day to impress them. And also to try and get money from them by busking.

In series 4 she has a major storyline in the episode "Troll". In this episode, fearing she's being overlooked especially after Harry's departure, she comes up with an idea which she hopes will put her center stage, but it ends up with her heavily upsetting Finn.

In Series 5, she gets a chance to star in a commercial playing the daughter of a woman. Since she shouldn't know what it is like to have a mum, she struggles with the idea but is able to play the role well. While at first, she decides to get fostered, she quickly changes her mind when she realizes that everyone else cares about her.

Floss is an incredibly bubbly young girl, with short curly ginger hair and green eyes. She is very mischievous and can be manipulative, always doing what she can to get what she wants. Although she is very sarcastic and can be rude, she has a good heart and wants to be loved deep down.

In Series 8, it's revealed via a DNA test that Ross is her twin brother and her mum's name is Jane Sadler, making her real last name Sadler. They go in search of their mum on their own, following an address but it is the wrong house.

In Series 9, Floss is given the chance to meet her real mum and ask her the questions she has always wanted to know answers to. However, when she realizes that her mum isn't coming to take her out of care, she becomes upset and decides to cut contact with her.

Mo Michaels

Anthony "Mo" Michaels, portrayed by Reece Buttery, made his first appearance on 1 March 2013 in series 1 of The Dumping Ground during the episode "Oh, Mo!". He departed in series 4.

Mo is a kind, eccentric kid in the 'Dumping Ground'. He first appeared in "Oh, Mo!" His age is 10, as of series 3 of The Dumping Ground. In series 4, Mo is annoyed by younger residents like Joseph.

The Dumping Ground Series 1 – Mo arrived at the Elm Tree House prior to the episode Oh, Mo! where he was made to share a room with Tyler. To Tyler's ire, Mo enjoyed collecting rubbish from the bins (which he dubbed treasure, which he made arts and crafts from) and would take it into their bedroom, effectively turning the bedroom into a rubbish dump. This eventually annoyed Tyler to the point that one day, he took Mo's "treasure" and dumped it over the stairs onto the ground floor, declaring that it was what he had to put up with. Mo was told to take his "treasure" to the attic and Tyler ended up being moved to Rick's bedroom, leading to Mo getting the room to himself, with which he was very pleased and tried to give Tyler a hug (to Tyler's disgust). Whilst the others (except Jody and Elektra) were out, Mo took belongings from the other residents' rooms and (with Floss's help) built an "Ant Theme Park" by placing jam on the belongings to attract the ants, which he had brought into the house. This unfortunately led to Mo receiving more ire from the Dumping Ground residents, only to be stopped by Tee.
Later, Mo offered to build a scarecrow to help scare birds away from Gina's vegetables, which he would build out of his "treasure". Mo did this with Tee's help, as she had befriended Mo to help him settle in. Mo decided to declare Tee his "best friend" and wanted to hang around her including sitting next to her at dinner, much to Tee's ire and the amusement of the other 'DG' residents. The following morning, Mo wanted to give his grandmother's pearls (which Jody and Elektra had stolen) to Tee, but could not find him, so he went to ask Tee for help. Unfortunately, Tee had reached the end of her tether with Mo and went to destroy Mo's scarecrow with a cricket bat. Tee succeeded in knocking the scarecrow down, which unfortunately landed on top of Mo, who had followed Tee. Mo was taken to hospital and Mike intended for him to be moved into emergency foster care as Mo was clearly not settling down at Elm Tree House. However, the other kids realised that Mo was no different to them in that they all had a complicated start in life, so they rebuilt his scarecrow as a welcome home present, saying that they wanted Mo to stay. Jody also returned the pearls she and Elektra had stolen (to Elektra's annoyance) so Mo could present them to Tee as a gift. Tee refuses but agrees to take them in the end.

In "Seriously Funny", Tee and Carmen left for a sleepover at Lily's flat, Mo gave Tee a hug (as he was fond of doing) as the girls hugged each other. After the girls left, he said that he wished he could go. The following day, Mo took Tyler's practical joke toys on learning that Tyler no longer wished to play practical jokes.

Prior to "Scary Beasts", Mo purchased a "magic" egg, thinking that it would hatch into a bird. One night, the egg hatched. Mo declared this to the house the following morning, declaring that it had hatched into a bird and it had gone missing. It later transpired that Mo's "bird" was in fact a snake, which Johnny and Elektra found. Mo decided to call his snake "Mike", which the others joked would lead to confusion.

The Dumping Ground Series 2 – When Faith was admitted to hospital, Mo decided to make her a "get well soon" card, but ended up with glitter over his face in the process. When Faith later returned from hospital, Mo greeted her saying that they had made her a surprise. Faith was then heard trashing her room (annoyed about being in a wheelchair), leading to Mo commenting that she would not like his invention (a watering can attached to a pole). Later, Mo decided to use one of Bailey's football boots to make shoe prints with, only for it to be taken by Tyler and Rick, who were trying to sell Bailey's boots. The following day, he, Harry and Floss (with whom he had become friends with by this point) were watching the TV when Faith ordered them out to watch a film.
When a training video for care children was being filmed at the 'Dumping Ground', Mo was given an old camera for him to use. After getting the camera to work, Mo filmed the other residents (including Johnny making a "Care Kid Sandwich") which was later seen by the lady making the training video.
On the day of Lily's leaving barbecue, Carmen tricked Mo into thinking that there was gold underneath the potatoes in the vegetable patch, as a way of getting out of her chores. Later that day, Mo found a golden wrapper in the vegetable patch and believed it to be treasure (when really it was from one of Floss's sweets).
On the day the older residents went out to look for Frank, Mo was due to have a dentist appointment. Mo, fearing the dentist, hid in the garden, but was found by Floss and Harry. Mo was coaxed out, only for a bird to poo on him. Harry cheered up Mo, saying that when a bird pooed on you, it was lucky (something Sapphire had told him). Mo then found a pound coin on the ground and was then told by May-Li that his appointment had been cancelled as the dentist was ill. On learning that Frank had gone missing, Mo, Floss and Harry waited for birds to poo on them, thinking that the lucky bird poo would lead to Frank being found. However, this initially did not work as Mo ended up chasing the birds away by running toward them and shouting at them to pick him. Instead, Floss had Mo and Harry untie one of May-Li's washing lines while she took bread to attract the birds while May-Li was distracted. Consequently, all three children were punished (by being made to tidy up the garden and take the sheets in) when May-Li discovered what had happened with the bread.
Some time afterwards, the other 'DG' residents teased Mo's snake, now renamed "Rocky", saying that he was boring. Out to prove otherwise, Mo purchased a box of locusts that escaped after Mike untapped the box and left it on the piano with the lid open. Consequently, Mo, with Harry and Floss, set about rounding up the 50+ locusts from other places in the 'Dumping Ground'. After finally rounding them up, Mo revealed to the rest of the 'DG' why he had bought them: they were bait for Rocky to perform tricks in a show he was putting on. Unfortunately, Rocky refused to respond to Mo's commands (despite having responded in practice) even when Mo attempted to charm him with a recorder. Faith later suggested to Mo that Rocky was depressed, prompting Mo to give Rocky to a man who owned numerous other snakes, on the reasoning that Mo could play with his friends whenever he wanted and so wanted to let Rocky do the same thing.
When the 'DG' residents held the "Touch The Telly" challenge, Mo was the only care kid to not pick a side. Instead, he was appointed the referee and was responsible for seeing who was out of the game, how long people had taken on their toilet breaks and how many they had been on. Like the other kids, Mo fell asleep in the lounge the following night and saw neither the football game nor the talent show.
In I Have a Dream, the DG residents were informed of a short story competition and May-Li decided to hold a competition in the house and would send off the winning entry. Mo decided that he wanted to submit a story, but had trouble deciding what it would be on (though he did get as far as the first line "I like cheese"). He was also made to go shopping with Bailey, whom he annoyed by asking who decided where everything in the supermarket was positioned. Mo later pestered Bailey by asking why he had not yet read his letter, saying that he would be excited to receive one, and eventually sussed out that Bailey was dyslexic, going on to say that his dad was dyslexic and that he had to read letters for him. Bailey initially denied being dyslexic, then later asked for Mo's help in reading it (albeit, claiming he could not read it because the writing was untidy). Mo then decided to help Bailey write a short story at the cost of writing his own story. Bailey went on to win the short story. However, Mo revealed the plot when he started reading Bailey's story and when Carmen read the story for herself, she wondered how Mo could have known the plot it was Bailey's story. This led to Johnny accusing Bailey of bullying Mo to write his story, which led to Mo shouting that they had got it all wrong and storming out of the kitchen, leading to him telling May-Li about Bailey's problem afterwards. Bailey went on to win the competition and won tickets for himself and another person to take with him, so he picked Mo, who proceeded to give him a hug.
When Harry was told that he could not go to a wrestling tournament, he came up with the idea of having a wrestling tournament with one of the other 'DG' kids. Mo declined to be Harry's opponent, but they both went to find Tyler, who agreed to be the announcer. Later, after Harry had had his costume made by Tee, Mo suggested that Harry have a tattoo on his face, which he agreed to.
On learning that Floss was to be adopted, Mo asked her if she would still live at the 'DG', only to be told by Harry that adoption meant Floss would be leaving and never coming back. This upset Mo, who told May-Li that she needed to turn away any parents who wanted to adopt him, to which May-Li said to him that Mo was not going to be adopted and was only living at Ashdene Ridge until his parents were fit to take care of him.
Some time afterwards, when Liam came to the 'Dumping Ground' to look for Frank, Mo answered to door to him. When asked where Frank was, Mo told Liam that he was at the cinema with Johnny, prompting Liam to leave, despite Mo offering to get Mike. Later when Liam came to temporarily stay at the 'DG', Mo's part in the plan to get Faith her work placement back was to sing "Twelve Tiny Hours" (a song Liam had written) with Johnny and Rick, but Mo's singing was so atrocious he decided that he did not want to sing at all.

The Dumping Ground Series 3 – On the day of the 'Dumping Ground's' open day in "Party Games", Mo helped to add food colouring some cupcakes for the guests. Later in the day, however, Mo decided to run a bath and poured the food colouring that he had used on the cupcakes. The water overflowed the bath, fell into the living room downstairs (soaking Matt, Stephanie Brantston and Carmen) and also soaked Johnny'd bedroom as well. Mo was caught after he tried to get away from the living room and was made to show his hands which were coloured red by the food colouring. Mo explained that he did this to stop the fostering party and prevent Carmen being fostered by the Brantstons, calling them "nasty people".
The day after the events in "Grand Theft DG", Mo was made to share with new boy, Ryan. Who arrived the following day. On the same day, Mo discovered the purses that had gone missing had been dumped in a bin outside the 'DG'. He was going to tell Mike, but was stopped by Ryan who convinced him to show him first, then was convinced to keep quiet by Ryan on the grounds that the police would implicate him as his fingerprints would be on the purses, as Mo had told Ryan he had touched them a bit. Tee managed to get the truth out of Mo eventually after Mo started to talk at the kitchen table, but then kept quiet. They searched the bins only to find the purses were now gone. Tee and Mo confronted Ryan, who lied that he had not moved the purses. Later that day, while Ryan was speaking to Maude Gordon (Harry's potential foster sister, who had taken the money from the purses) in the attic, Mo followed Tee (who was recording Ryan and Maude's conversation) and sneezed, prompting Ryan to get Maude to turn herself in.
In "Stuck With You", Kazima noticed Mo was feeling down and not being his usual cheery self. Kazima bought Mo a "Build Your Own Robot" from a yard sale in the neighbour hood to cheer Mo up. But when Mo found that there were some pieces missing this made him worse, causing him to shout at Kazima. Mo locked himself in Faith's old bedroom and built a fort out of boxes with some of her old belongings in. But all the boxes ended up falling on Mo. Mike and May-Li find Mo and manage to rescue him. In the kitchen/dining room he tells Mike, May-Li and Kazima why he's been feeling down. he had a letter from his Dad (really Grandad but this was not revealed until the episode "Where is Love") saying that she his Mum (Nana) was having crucial surgery. But when Mike read the letter he lets Mo know it says something else and assures Mo his Mother (Grandmother) will be fine, and the operation is nothing to worry about.

Mo's last appearance was in the Series 4 finale "Two For Joy". It was mentioned in the first episode of Series 5 that Mo had moved back in with his Grandad.

May-Li Wang

May-Li Wang, portrayed by Stacy Liu, made her first appearance on 16 December 2013 in the Christmas special episode "Jody in Wonderland", between series 1 and series 2 of The Dumping Ground. It is likely she replaced Gina, who left after accepting a higher paying job to pay for her mother who has dementia.

New boy Bailey (Kasey MacKellar) and May-Li prevents him running away. His social worker Serjay (Danny Ashok) tries to pass the responsibility of telling Bailey will be remaining at the 'Dumping Ground' to Mike and May-Li, but May-Li insists he is to do so. May-Li and Mike (Connor Byrne) prevent Bailey from leaving with his Father, Jimmy (Mark Theodore), due to now being legally in charge of Bailey. May-Li lectures the young people when they go to find  Frank (Christopher Slater). May-Li accompanies Tyler's (Miles Butler-Hughton) during a day out with his Mum, Sally (Diveen Henry), but Sally runs off with Tyler, who has not taken her bipolar medication. When the young people are divided on what to watch on TV, May-Li sides with those who want to watch football, but they all fall asleep after a competition. Frank ruins Faith's (Leanne Dunstan) and Rick's (Daniel Pearson) clothes by adding a red top, turning the other clothes pink. May-Li suggests they have a cake baking competition, where the losing team have to wear a pink dress and she comforts Mo (Reece Buttery) when he writes Bailey a story on his behalf for a competition as he may have dyslexia. Floss (Sarah Rayson) takes a liking to Carmen's nail stuff, so May-Li talks to Floss about her being left as a baby in a nail bar and Carmen's nail things may bring back memories. May-Li finds out Johnny (Joe Maw) is considering joining the army and Mike disagrees with May-Li encouraging Johnny, viewing it is a good thing. May-Li supervises Floss when she meets potential adoptive parents, Doug (Michael Hodgson) and Nerys (Lucy Speed) meet Floss at the 'Dumping Ground'. May-Li accompanies and observes Floss, Doug and Nerys at the park and when Floss runs away after pushing a boy, Jesse (Alex Humprey), May-Li finds her. May-Li allows Tee (Mia McKenna-Bruce) to go with Floss to Doug and Nerys' house, but after the visit, Floss shows Tee and May-Li her scrapbook full of celebrity images as Floss tries to imagine her Mum. May-Li tells Floss she can live at the 'Dumping Ground'.

Bailey takes on responsibility of a dog, Mischief (Sage), after he blames himself for the death of his homeless owner Mal (Dai Bradley) and he wins Mike and May-Li round upon training him. When Harry Jones leaves the 'Dumping Ground' for a foster family, Floss cuts off Jeff the giraffe's head and May-Li later returns Jeff to him. Mike and May-Li lecture Tee and Kazima when they leave a holiday club and what they should have done after catching two burglars. Ryan (Lewis Hamilton) accesses everyone's records and he receives a text from Harry, asking for help and he tells Mike and May-Li about Harry's foster placement. Ryan takes Harry and his foster brother, Finn (Ruben Reuter), from their foster home and when they arrive at the 'Dumping Ground', Harry doesn't want to go back. Harry and Finn tell May-Li what their foster home was like. A rabbit is found in the garden and Toni (Nelly Currant) calls it Mr Nibbles. Billie (Gwen Currant) and Finn show May-Li a picture of Toni with her Dad and a rabbit, Mr Nibbles, resembling the one they found. Toni and Billie tell May-Li that their dad let Mr Nibbles out of the hutch and they had foxes. May-Li receives a call from the rabbit owner and she breaks the news to Toni. Toni decides not to accept May-Li's offer of a rabbit when the rabbit has baby rabbits.

New girl Sasha (Annabelle Davis) arrives at the 'Dumping Ground' before being moved to secure accommodation. She smashes the minibus lights to prevent the young people seeing Lily (Jessie Williams), but chooses to apologise. Whilst out shopping with May-Li, Sasha kicks a display intentionally when she sees her Brother, Dexter (Alexander Aze), shoplifting, she deliberately knocks a display down and Kazima tells May-Li. May-Li collects Jody Jackson (Kia Pegg) from a shop after taking the blame for shoplifting. Bailey is promised football tickets by his reviewing officer, Abi (Kemi-Bo Jacobs), but he wants to change his record and gets Faith to help, but May-Li catches him and is not impressed. When Abi is impressed with Bailey, May-Li prevents Bailey receiving the tickets, informing her of what Bailey did. May-Li receives some expensive cheese from her Mother, but she later finds it stolen. Carmen and Kazima question everyone and the culprit is revealed to be Mischief. May-Li lends Carmen an antique necklace, but Carmen drops it down the toilet accidentally and when Carmen thinks about either leaving it or attempting to get it out, she decides to tell May-Li. May-Li allows Sasha to go out to a skate night if she makes dinner, but she leaves Toni (Nelly Currant) and Billie (Gwen Currant), to put a lasagne in the oven, but the dinner gets burnt when he oven is put on too high due to Ryan messing with the time. May-Li bans Sasha from the skate night, but Tee and Sasha decide to go as May-Li will not be at work and Toni and Billie agree to cover them. May-Li ends up having to work, so  Billie and Toni lock her in the bathroom. Tee owns up to going to the skate park, with May-Li already knowing that Sasha went, when Billie and Toni are grounded. Tee makes amends with the young people and convinces May-Li and Mike to let Sasha stay. May-Li's Grandmother, PoPo (Pik-Sen Lim) and May-Li does not want to take over her shop. May-Li allows PoPo to teach the young people kung fu and when Jody tells May-Li that she and PoPo should make up, May-Li explains how PoPo does not accept her family as her partner is a woman. When May-Li discusses taking over the business, PoPo hurts May-Li when she will not allow May-Li's adopted children to inherit it, insisting that they are not her family and May-Li didn't give birth to them. After a kung fu contest, May-Li gives PoPo the chance to meet her children. Later, May-Li receives a family heirloom from PoPo, her great-great-Grandfather's diary. Jasna (Dolya Gavanski) gives Kazima the results off her age assessment test to prove she is a minor to stay in the UK and her birth year is determined as 1997, meaning she is 18 and will have to be deported. May-Li comforts Kazima, reassuring her they are going to appeal the decision and Carmen arranges for Kazima's appeal to be filmed. Kazima is allowed to stay when she is reunited with her Father, Hakim Tako (Richard Pepple).

The 'Dumping Ground' is inspected by OFSTED inspectors, Rowena (Alison Hammond) and Lizzie (Kate Copeland), who are impressed by a play put on by the young people. Sasha returns from her Mum's after finding out she is pregnant, so she tells May-Li she wants to be fostered and May-Li and Mike tell her she has been matched to potential adoptive parents. Floss decides she wants to leave the 'Dumping Ground' when she bullies Finn and May-Li figures out she misses Harry, so gets Floss to apologise to Finn. Kazima confesses to breaking into the office when the young people are threatened with being grounded, telling May-Li and Mike she wants to get adopted to stay in the UK and took files of those who were adopted. May-Li and Mike explain the difficulty of finding adoptive parents for someone her age and it's normally by someone who knows them. The young people figure out Kazima is doing stuff May-Li likes, realising she wants May-Li to adopt her and the young people overhear May-Li telling Mike she will think about it, but Kazima changes her mind and is told later she can stay. On Tee and Carmen's last day, they are told they will not be housed together due to a change in council policy and Tee declines May-Li's offer of her telling Carmen. When May-Li comments on how Tee and Carmen are with each other, their social worker manages to house them together.

May-Li, Mike and the young people are invited to meet their new neighbours, Peter and Janet Umbleby (Simon Ludders and Alison Pargeter), who mistake the young people for Mike and May-Li's children and when they find out them being from a care home, they decide to hold a public meeting. May-Li and Mike are panicked that they may receive another OFSTED visit and Ryan (Lewis Hamilton) believes he is going to leave the 'Dumping Ground' after overhearing a conversation, however, Joseph (Yousef Naseer) chooses to volunteer to leave, but it turns out it was for a theme park trip as a representative. May-Li and Mike are not happy when Chloe (Hannah Moncur) disappears with a girl, Candi Rose (Carma Hylton), when she is out with Ryan and May-Li figures out Kazima likes the Umblebys son, Edward Umbleby (Jaimie Boubezari) when she hates the way Peter is with Edward. Chloe is shocked when Candi-Rose arrives at the 'Dumping Ground' with May-Li, as is Candi-Rose when she sees Chloe, as they both lied and Candi-Rose promises she intended to tell Chloe the truth and Chloe tearfully confides in May-Li she wanted a friend to like her for herself as she does not like herself. May-Li helps Archie (Jethro Baliba) when he injures himself and Archie offers to help May-Li do a border in the garden, coming up with plans, and Archie denies to Ryan that he has got May-Li confused as a mum. May-Li and Mike find out about Archie's feelings when Ryan is accused of trashing the border, but May-Li reassures him he is special. Floss is picked to appear in a commercial and May-Li helps her when Floss struggles with how to act with a TV Mum without having her own and she tells May-Li and Mike she wants to be adopted. When Archie is convinced he is getting younger, May-Li and Mike give him a parcel of things from his dad. May-Li returns from a holiday, where a boy and an old man, Alex (Connor Lawson) and George (Paul Barber), are in the attic, who Kazima and Tyler are trying to help. May-Li finds out about it when Alex confronts Kazima over George disappearing, who does it to get Alex to stay at the 'Dumping Ground', which the young people do not like. Kazima receives a video call from her father in Denmark, Kazima chooses to join him and May-Li takes Kazima to the airport.

In Series 5 Episode 20, the 'DG' is in pieces as Mike and May-li fight because Mike had written 'not nice stuff' about May-li on her form. The 'DG' sees this is getting out of hand and propose a meal for Mike and May-li to make up. However, this also ends in casualty as May-li says to Mike that she will leave.

May-Li announces to Mike and the young people she is pregnant and due before Christmas when Finn and Joseph discover she has been eating coal and then afterwards, she had a Son named Henry who was named after Charlie's Grandad.

In Series 10, May-Li is offered a new job that is closer to home and has more money and would be closer to Alice and the kids, allowing her to spend more time with her family. She argues with Alice and turns down the job because she doesn't want to leave everyone at Ashdene Ridge but she seems to regret her decision. With support from the kids, May-Li decides to take the new job.

On her last day at the Dumping Ground, she finds out that Candi-Rose's real name has been exposed and that her parents have tracked her down. Because of this, Candi-Rose has to leave Ashdene Ridge that day to be moved to a new care home with a new name. May-Li reassured Candi-Rose that she will be fine and watches Candi-Rose leave for her new care home before she leaves to go on holiday with Alice before she starts her new job.

Bailey Wharton

Bailey Wharton, portrayed by Kasey MacKellar, made his first appearance on 10 January 2014 in series 2 of The Dumping Ground during the episode "Booting Up - Part 1". He departed in series 5 during the episode "Back In The Game - Part 2".

He is shown to be quite aggressive and cocky, with a very short temper, and likes to wind people up, especially Johnny and Mike. He is a skilled footballer and is often criticised by the others for thinking he is better than he is and making unnecessary comments. It is later revealed he is dyslexic. Bailey later befriends Mo Michaels and Jody Jackson, but doesn't always see eye to eye with Jody during the progression of series 2.
During Series 3–4, Bailey is shown to be reserved and has a more withdrawn character, either spending his time with Mischief or football. He is also
shown to have calmed down and eventually it is opened up to his sensitive nature when he comforts Mo and meets his 'mother' in Series 4.

In the fourth episode of the third season, Bailey has a fight with a homeless  man (Mal), and ends up causing him to fall over when trying to get his football back off Mal, but at the time, Bailey thought he pushed him. The next day when Bailey goes into town again, he notices a memorial where Mal sat with his dog. With the letters R I P on the bench. Bailey thought that he had killed Mal. Guilty of his actions, Bailey adopts his dog, Mischief, without consent from neither Mike Milligan or May-Li Wang. Mike and May-Li allow Bailey to keep Mischief, but as new resident Ryan Reeves was scared of dogs and too embarrassed to admit it. So he decided to cut Mischief's collar and let him out the garden so it looked like he had run away. When everyone noticed that Mischief was missing, Bailey and Tee put Mischief's picture up on a missing dogs website. Luckily there had been a sighting of him on a street nearby. Bailey went to get Mischief back and bring him home, but as Mischief ran across the road towards Bailey. A car came out of nowhere and knocked down Mischief. Mike met Bailey at the vets, and explained to him that Bailey was going to have to be brave and say goodbye to Mischief. This was when Bailey confessed to Mike that he killed Mischief's owner. Mike had no choice but to take Bailey to the police station and make a statement. Luckily, they found out that it wasn't Bailey's fault Mal died. Meanwhile, back at the DG the others were raising money in order to pay for Mischief's vet bills. They raise enough money for Mischief to have the operation by selling cups of soup in town that Kazima made. Mischief came home and Bailey became his new owner.

On his last episode he and Sasha saved Dexter from getting into more trouble that Roddy dragged him into (it is revealed Roddy is a thief).
Bailey's final appearance was the second episode of Series 5. At the end of the episode, he takes up the position of a junior football coach in the United States. So he left with Mischief to go and live in America.

Kazima Tako

Kazima Tako also Durrani, portrayed by Akuc Bol, made her first appearance on 31 January 2014 in series 2 of The Dumping Ground, during the episode Finding Frank. She departed in series 5, during the episode Farvel.

Frank hasn't been seen or heard of for a while, so Carmen (Amy-Leigh Hickman), Rick (Daniel Pearson), Bailey (Kasey MacKellar) and Tee (Mia McKenna-Bruce) try to track him down. They notice Kazima buying Frank's pocket watch, claiming it was her mother's and they find Frank and Kazima at a burger van. It emerges that Kazima and Frank are sleeping rough. Frank and Mike (Connor Byrne) later talk and Frank decides to move back in. Frank later informs Kazima that Mike is sorting things for her through children's services. Carmen reluctantly agrees to share her room with Kazima, however, Carmen is annoyed by Kazima's behaviour and orders Kazima to leave. Kazima sleeps on Frank's bedroom floor and when Mike and May-Li (Stacy Liu) discover this, they tell Kazima boys and girls cannot share rooms for their own protection. Kazima plans to sleep in the garage, but Carmen finds out and makes up with her.

Tee works on an Art project, but Kazima criticizes it and she introduces Tee to her friend, street artist Roscoe (Simeon Zack). When there is a trip to a theme park and not enough tickets, Kazima doesn't mind staying behind. Tee decides to remain behind to allow Toni (Nelly Currant) and Billie (Gwen Currant) to go together. Kazima and Tee are forced to attend a fun day, but they leave early and go home. Unknown to them, money was planted in Kazima's bag by Maz (Natifa Mai) and Max (Frankie Wilson). Maz and Max break into The Dumping Ground and when Kazima checks her bag, she and Tee decide to refuse to hand it back due to the large amount. Kazima and Tee attempt to scare Maz and Max out of The Dumping Ground. They end up locking Max in the attic and trick Maz into the kitchen before tying her up. Maz and Max are arrested and the other residents arrive home the same time after Mike is informed of Kazima and Tee disappearing from the fun day. Mike and May-Li lecture Kazima and Tee on the situation and all the kids are sent to the fun day. When Tyler (Miles Butler-Hughton) learns to play a trombone, Kazima helps him and she reveals her dad and brother were kidnapped for making music.

New girl, Sasha (Annabelle Davis), arrives at The Dumping Ground. After going home to collect her bedroom key, Sasha goes shopping with May-Li and Kazima. Kazima witnesses Sasha knocking down a display so she can speak to her brother, Dexter (Alexander Aze). When May-Li receives some expensive cheese from her mother, she later finds it stolen. Kazima and Carmen question everyone and they later reveal Mischief (Sage) as the culprit. Carmen drops May-Li's antique necklace down the toilet and Carmen thinks about what would happen if she left the necklace or if she tried to get it back. When Carmen thinks about getting it back, she enlists Kazima's help to get it back and they arrange for a plumber to fix the toilet.

As part of her application to stay in the UK, Kazima must prove she is a minor and undergo an age assessment. After finding out about Kazima's situation, Carmen tries to get Kazima to open up about what happened. Kazima explains how her father was captured by the army and her mother died at a Kenyan refugee camp before she fled to England. Kazima gets the results for her age assessment and is informed by Jasna (Dolye Gavanski) that they believe she was born in 1997 and is 18 years old. Kazima decides to runaway and she goes to Frank's, but she runs away when Mike and Carmen go visit. Later, Kazima reunited with her father, Hakim (Richard Pepple) and Kazima's age can be proved by documents. Kazima and Hakim learn that Kazima's brother maybe alive in Somalia and Hakim decides to go to Somalia, leaving Kazima at The Dumping Ground.

Kazima left The Dumping Ground halfway through the fifth series, in Episode 12, as she moved to Denmark with her father and brother. Kazima featured in 55 episodes of the series.

Ryan Reeves

Ryan Reeves, portrayed by Lewis G. Hamilton, made his first appearance on 16 January 2015 in series 3 of The Dumping Ground during the episode Law & Disorder: Part 2. He was sixteen in the seventh series.

He is a skilled liar who joins Ashdene Ridge in the wake of a disastrous foster party where wallets and purses were reported stolen and he became embroiled in the events, eventually working out the identity of the thief and blackmailing them to keep it a secret. He is aged thirteen with a Liverpudlian accent and short brown hair and quickly proves himself to be mischievous, deceitful and intelligent. He also becomes friends with Johnny Taylor when Ryan managed to keep Johnny's army dream alive by finding the thief of wallets and purses to clear Johnny's name. In "Mischief" it is revealed that he has cynophobia (fear of dogs). In "Who Are You?" it is discovered that he has a sister that got separated from him.
During his first episode, Ryan deleted an email sent to Mike concerning both mental health and himself, before destroying the computer keyboard.

Ryan and Tee Taylor often have issues, and they always fall out and accuse each other of things, which often becomes quite serious in certain situations.

In Series 7 Ryan faces a blast from the past when his Mum turns up whilst he is in town with Mike. She later comes to the Dumping Ground, where he becomes angry that she has turned up. Later on, Ryan takes her to their old house and tells her that he isn't the bad person that she thinks he is. After his Mum leaves, Ryan decides to leave the Dumping Ground and writes a letter to his friends explaining that they should look after Chloe, and that he is sorry for everything he ever did.

Toni Trent

Toni Trent, portrayed by Nelly Currant, made her first appearance on 23 January 2015 in series 3 of The Dumping Ground during the episode Stuck With You.

In "Fake it to Make It", Toni and Billie try to convince everyone that they are telepathic. However, the plan backfires when Bailey, Mo and Tyler start avoiding the twins because of it.

In "Breaking in" Toni is upset as there aren't enough tickets for her to go to the theme park with Billie and the other Dumping Ground kids. However, she is allowed to go after all as Tee gives Toni her ticket.

In "Dragon Slayer", Toni finds a rabbit in the garden, and believes it is the re-incarnation of a rabbit she had owned which had been killed by foxes after her dad left open its hutch to punish her. She is upset when she finds out that it has an owner. Eventually, May-Li managed to convince Toni that the rabbit wasn't hers as it was female.

In "Better Than You", Toni falls out with Billie, who doesn't like her bossing her about, leading to Floss and Toni stealing Billie's idea of giving tours around Ashdene Ridge.

In "The Switch", Toni and her twin sister Billie are adopted by a couple called Dom and Sally Harper.

It was revealed on 7 September 2018 that Nelly will be reprising her role as Toni Trent, along with some other old residents, as she can be seen walking up to the Dumping Ground in the new trailer.

Billie Trent

Billie Trent, portrayed by Gwen Currant, made her first appearance on 23 January 2015 in series 3 of The Dumping Ground during the episode Stuck With You.

In "Fake it to Make It", Billie and Toni tried to convince everyone that they were telepathic. However, the plan backfired when Bailey, Mo and Tyler started avoiding the twins because of it.

In "Dragon Slayer", Billie was worried about her sister, Toni, who got upset about a rabbit she found in the garden. Eventually Billie told May-Li that Toni had owned a rabbit when they lived with their parents.

In "Free to Good Home", Floss and Toni try to get Billie to pretend to be a gymnast in order to win a trampoline. However, Billie is unwilling and runs away.

In "Better Than You", Billie starts giving other children tours round the Dumping Ground, getting them to pay. However, when she falls out with Toni, Floss steals her idea, and she and Toni decide to give tours of their own. Billie teams up with Tyler and they plan their own rival tour; however, Faith tells them they shouldn't treat the Dumping Ground like a freak show, and persuades Billie and Tyler to stop giving tours. Billie eventually makes up with Toni.

In "The Switch", Billie and her twin sister Toni are adopted by a couple called Dom and Sally Harper.

It was revealed on 7 September 2018 that Gwen will be reprising her role as Billie Trent as well other old residents as they can be seen walking up to the dumping ground in the new trailer.

Mischief

Mischief, portrayed by ten-year-old Border collie Sage, made his first appearance on 30 January 2015 in series 3 of The Dumping Ground during the episode "Mischief". He departed in series 5 during the episode "Back In The Game".

Mischief is owned originally by a homeless man who Bailey bumps into; when the man later dies in hospital because of Bailey, his conscience means he becomes Mischief's new owner. However, when Mischief comes back to Ashdene Ridge, it soon becomes clear that he is very unruly – but Bailey must train him, or he will be put down. Eventually, all becomes well, and Mischief becomes the new Ashdene Ridge pet. Mischief left the show when Bailey did in series 5 as both went to America.

Finn McLaine

Finn McLaine, portrayed by Ruben Reuter, made his first appearance on 6 March 2015 in series 3 of The Dumping Ground during the episode "Long Way Home".

Finn is first fostered by the same family that Harry was fostered by but when things start to go wrong and Harry sends for help, Finn finally escape the foster home and joins the 'Dumping Ground' and makes a quick friendship with Harry and Ryan. Finn throughout the series have been friends with Floss, Toni and Billie, but still he is series 5 and 6. Finn had a mixed friendship with Joseph as he later becomes friends with going to the space centre. Later in Series 5B he is shown closer to Alex as he stole the money in "Rough Justice Series 5 Episode 19" that the statue he broke to replace it with a new one. In series 6, his storyline is told by Charlie on how his father put in care in the day he was born. He has Down syndrome.

As of Series 9, he only appeared in 3 episodes. This was due to the actor shielding during the majority of filming. The 3 episodes he appeared in were only small parts or as a background character. The 3 episodes he appeared in were: 'Moment of Truth', 'The Remote' and 'Festival Fibber'.

He has left between series 9 and 10

Sasha Bellman

Sasha Bellman, portrayed by Annabelle Davis, made her first appearance on 6 October 2015 in series 3 of The Dumping Ground during the episode "Three Days" and departed on 18 February 2022 in series 9.

When she arrived, she had caused chaos but then after a while, she starts to settle in well at Ashdene Ridge. She gets on well with most of the residents except Ryan, she becomes friends with Carmen and Tee.

Sasha is delighted when Kelly announces she is pregnant with Sasha's half-sister, but is left upset when Kelly says it wouldn't work with Sasha being at home. Sasha decides she wants to be fostered and is matched with an adoptive couple, Lou (Warwick Davis) and Ange (Francesca Papagno), but on a trip to the seaside, Sasha realises she's not ready to give up her family and she plants goods from a shop in Ange's bag. Sasha convinces Harry to get to know Lou and Ange. Sasha has dwarfism, most likely due to spondyloepiphyseal dysplasia congenita.

In series 6, She was about to leave to join Dexter and his family in the new house but she decided to stay in Ashdene Ridge as she was Sorry/Not Sorry (hence the title of the episode).

She is known to be an artist, which developed from Series 5 onwards and a knitter which developed from Series 7 onwards

Her old best friend Freya appeared in Ashdene Ridge in Series 7 but she was there to make Sasha's life miserable instead of being a better person. However, its unknown where she is currently.

In Series 9, Sasha gets an opportunity to meet Drew, the lead singer from her favorite band, Death Night Thrashers and tries to stop the band from breaking up. Her attempts earn her an opportunity to be Drew's assistant where she is conflicted but after some convincing from Jody and Murphy, she decides to take the opportunity and leave the Dumping Ground.

Dexter Bellman

Dexter Bellman, portrayed by Alexander Aze, made his first appearance on 6 October 2015 in series 3 of The Dumping Ground during the episode "Three Days".

Series 3
Dexter turns up at the 'Dumping Ground' looking for his sister, however his sister, Sasha (Annabelle Davis) tells him he has to go and she gets him out of the 'Dumping Ground'. Sasha realises Dexter took her room key, so she goes home for it and Dexter needs Sasha's help to get nappies. Sasha ends up going shopping with May-Li (Stacy Liu) and she catches Dexter shoplifting nappies and Dexter tells her he couldn't find any money. After catching Dexter trying to shoplift, Sasha goes home and Murphy (Thomas and Oliver Waldram) is all alone. Dexter turns up unexpectedly, asking for Sasha. Dexter later throws rubbish over the health and safety inspector's (Shameem Ahmed) car in order to be taken into care, but his family are given the support of Social Services.

Series 4
After Sasha is teased by Ryan (Lewis Hamilton) after he discovers her vlog, Sasha goes home and goes to the park with Dexter and his friend, but Sasha believes their mum is rubbish at looking after him. At home after speaking to their mum, Sasha realises Dexter is fine.

Series 5
When Sasha finds out their stepbrother, Roddy (Alfie Browne-Sykes), is involving Dexter in burglaries, she finds Dexter in a building with stolen things and that Kelly is involved. Dexter is placed under a voluntary care order. In the episode "Sasha Bellman P.I", a package that was sent to Archie was stolen by Dexter because he was 'curious' and 'never really got any packages from home before', and Sasha has to cover up for him, resulting in the package being found in Jody's room, Tyler being blamed but then proven innocent and the whole house having extra chores - and only Sasha, Jody and Dexter himself knew that it was really Dexter who did it. Dexter promised to Sasha he would never steal other people's things again but he may not be able to keep his promise.

Dexter left the show off screen in between Series 5 & 6. He moved back in with his mum, step-dad, brother and baby sister. He made two guest appearances in Series 6, and confirming that he had moved back in with his mum. Sasha was going to join him in the episode "SorryNotSorry". But Sasha realised that she'd rather stay at the 'Dumping Ground', and in the area she was in.

Murphy Bellman

Murphy Bellman made his first appearance in the series 3 episode "Free to Good Home" broadcast on 13 October 2015. Introduced as the infant brother of Sasha (Annabelle Davis) and Dexter Bellman (Alexander Aze), he was played by Thomas and Oliver Waldram in series 3 and Fred Montgomery Scott in series 4. He was reintroduced as part of the main cast in the series 9 episode "Run, Rescue, Repeat" broadcast on 13 August 2021, now played by Lenny Rush.

Sasha visits her old home and finds Dexter and Murphy by themselves while their mum sleeps. She later finds Dexter shoplifting for nappies and realises that Murphy has been left home alone. Social services arrange support for their mum to help her take care of her sons.

Some years later, in series 9, Sasha finds Murphy trying to steal Scott Jenson's (Louis Payne) phone and discovers that he has been left on his own again whilst their mum is on holiday in Spain. Arrangements are made to put Murphy in temporary care at Ashdene Ridge, but he refuses to settle in and has several tantrums, smashing the TV and destroying Sasha's college art project in the process. Enraged, Sasha goes to their home to get away from him and learns that their mum has been neglecting Murphy once again causing problems at school. Returning to the DG, Sasha manages to calm Murphy down and starts helping him learn how to settle in.

Murphy does not return for Series 10, possibly back living with his mum again.

Chloe Reeves

Chloe Reeves, portrayed by Hannah Moncur, made her first appearance on 19 February 2016 in series 4 of The Dumping Ground during the episode "Hold the Front Page". Chloe's brother is Ryan, and they are constantly arguing and fighting. In "The Fairytail Princess", Chloe meets Candi-Rose, and wants to make a good impression on her. Both girls end up lying to make themselves sound better. Candi-Rose then moves in, much to Chloe and Ryan's surprise. Chloe's best friend is Candi-Rose. In more recent episodes, Chloe has been with Joseph, and has blackmailed her brother.

In Series 9, Chloe has been given the chance to live with her Scottish Friend Iona and her family but doesn't want to leave her best friend Candi-Rose, she then decides to get fostered and leaves the DG

Joseph Stubbs

Joseph Stubbs, portrayed by Yousef Naseer, made his first appearance on 28 November 2016 in series 4 of The Dumping Ground during the episode "It Takes Two". Joseph seems to like to do chores. Been as when Mike told Tyler to wash the floor, Joseph insisted he would do it, while he was sorting out people's shoes. He also loves space, and broke into an observatory with Finn so that he could see the moon more clearly. He is very intelligent as he was able to calculate 40 divided by 3 equals to 13.33 recurring. He gets along with the older residences like Tyler, Jody, Kazima, Tee and Bailey. He is also best friends with Finn, Archie and Dexter. Joseph is also sensible as in "Rough Justice" everyone thinks Alex has nits but Joseph opposed them to not blame it on him just because he is angry. He is also close to Johnny who makes a guest appearance in "Save the DG" after expressing the idea of how to save the DG. Out of the DG, Joseph is the most caring and likeable.

Series 4 (TDG)
Joseph was introduced after Sammy left, he started to settle after being shown poor relationships with Mo, Ryan, Floss and Finn. But he did make friends with Archie, Chloe, Tyler, Bailey and Jody. As he is shown close to Bailey Wharton he sent an apology letter for kidnapping Mischief as he also felt bad for Tyler Lewis as Bailey mocked him as the worst dancer. Later, Bailey cleared the misunderstanding that he did not mean to insult him but to have a laugh. It is shown that Joseph is a very kind-hearted kid.

Series 5 (TDG)
In "One Giant Leap" Ryan misunderstood that Mike is getting rid of him so he manipulates the residents to get rid of Joseph as Ryan assumes that Joseph has no friends, but in the end it was actually Ryan who was picked to represent the fair for Ashdene Ridge but other wanted Joseph to go after being heard a huge misunderstanding.

In "Wardrobe" Ryan blames Joseph for staying behind with him and Kazima because Ryan wanted to cheat in the card game by making Tyler pick Finn but Joseph asks Finn that he likes dinosaurs as they both got along in "One Giant Leap", as the wardrobe got delivered as Kazima and Joseph are trying to move the wardrobe in the house but when Joseph checks inside he gets locked inside as they start to chase after the wardrobe, later they lose track as Joseph escapes from the wardrobe using Ryan's grandfathers' medal as to make him move the wardrobe as Kazima emotionally gets happy that Joseph is found and later Ryan patches up with him.

In "Rough Justice." Joseph and Jody were accused for stealing the money as they have eyewitnesses to prove they are innocent, but Floss perjures them to make them feel guilty. The money was raised by Joseph as he is to desperate to find the lava lamp in the planetarium as Jody assists him. As when Floss bribes Joseph to accuse Jody, but he refused to as he exposes Floss, later on it was Finn who stole the money to buy a new ornament for Alex.

He left after the sixth series, probably meaning he got fostered.

Archie Able

Archibald Jeremiah "Archie" Able, portrayed by Jethro Baliba, made his first appearance on 21 November 2016 in series 4 of The Dumping Ground during the episode "How to Be Perfect". Archie tends to get on well with everyone. He has been shown to be closest to Joseph, Bailey and Ryan.

Series 4 (TDG)
Archie is introduced to the young people by May-Li Wang (Stacy Liu) in the episode "How To Be Perfect". When Kazima Tako (Akuc Bol) asks May-Li to adopt her (to help with her application to stay in the UK), Archie is one of the others to compete with Kazima to be adopted. Archie also told Kazima after asking about her dad and brother, that he has no family at all. And that he tends to move around a lot, and called himself as unique and collectable. It had been noted that he saw Bailey Wharton  as a brotherly figure, as the two get along well. Archie's best best friend is Joseph Stubbs. He has also shown to be quite close with Dexter Bellman.

Series 5 (TDG)
In "Sittin' In A Tree" Archie seems to see May-Li  as a mother-like figure. Ryan notices this. Archie asked if he could go to the garden centre with May-Li, May-Li said yes but ended up going with Toni. Archie was upset about this and ended up trashing the garden. May-Li feels bad for going to the garden centre without Archie, as she didn't realise how important it was to Archie. Archie later expresses his worries out loud to Ryan about getting too attached to care workers, who tells him "It's just a phase - and then you get over it." And Ryan made Archie feel better by telling him that he had got too attached to a care worker in the past.

In "Sasha Bellman P.I." Toni  and Billie Trent, both manage to somehow convince Archie that he's ageing backwards, because he told them he remembers being in a wheelchair giving talks to students, as well as knowing a really old song, and then concludes he only has 8 years left of his life until he turns into nothing, and so develops a bucket list including things like to swim with dolphins, learn to swim (again) and see the Queen. But May-Li quickly puts a stop to this, telling him that he wasn't in a wheelchair, he was in a pushchair, and his dad was giving talks - not him, and the really old song that he knew was his dad's favourite and his dad always put it on, which is how he knew it. That very day, Dexter  stole his package but he got it back, it contained books from his father's university and from the way Archie gets extremely emotional, it's clear Archie's dad died.

Series 6 (TDG)
In "Jody on the Ropes", Archie competes in the Hunger Games style battle to win the luxury bedroom in the attic. (That later turned out it wasn't for Ashdene Ridge). Archie teams up with Charlie. Archie earned third place in the battle, as he was "taken down" by Alex and used as bait to try and take down Charlie.

In "Saved By the Bell", when Jody was arguing with Sasha in her bedroom, Jody pushed Sasha out of her room and was extremely angry. Archie opened Jody's door, but Jody thought it was Sasha, so she slammed the door very hard telling her to leave her alone. The door was knocked back in Archie's face giving him a bloody nose. Luckily it wasn't broken. Jody didn't mean to hurt Archie, or Sasha. But she was struggling to control her anger during that time.

In "Give and Take", Jody's anger seemed to of passed on to Archie, as he was getting extremely angry with everything and everyone. It started when he lost to Alex and Jody whilst playing football. May-Li suggested for Archie to do some yoga to meditate, to help calm him down and would hopefully not make him get so wound up. Archie found it hard to meditate as he couldn't find a quiet place to do it. He originally tried doing it in his room, and asked May-Li if she could do it with him. May-Li was in the middle of reading a book, which was the last in the series, and was just wanting to be on her own. As she didn't want to upset Archie, she just mentioned that it's better for him to do his meditation in the garden, alone. Archie tries to meditate in the garden, but struggles to do so as insects kept buzzing and flying around him. He later joined May-Li in the quiet room and started meditating again. But again, he was interrupted when Charlie and Sasha started having an argument in the kitchen. Archie expressed his anger to May-Li saying that "them two (Charlie and Sasha) are totally ruining my zen!". Archie finally managed to complete his meditation which made him feel more relaxed.

In "Heroes", Joseph asks Mike if he could move into Archie's room as they are best friends. Mike said yes, as long as he clears it up with Finn (his roommate at the time) and Archie. Mike then gives Joseph a colourful coat from the lost and found, saying he could have it been as it's in the lost and found box. Joseph put it on and went to find Archie to tell him about moving in. But the move and their friendship is put on hold when the coat Mike gave to Joseph turned out to be Archie's, and Archie accuses Joseph of stealing and tells him he doesn't want him moving into his room and stealing more of his things. Archie and Joseph continue to snub each, and give each other dirty looks at lunchtime at the dinner table. They both end up fighting over the last sausage, causing drinks and plates to fall off and over the table. And in the end Taz steals the last sausage at the last minute. Mike and May-Li talk to Joseph and Archie after this and to get them to make up, Mike and May-Li pretend that if they do not make up, one of them will move to Sleepy Hollow, a house on an island. Archie and Joseph go around asking everyone to vote who they think should stay and who goes, but the young people refuse to vote for either of them over the other. In the end Finn is left with the deciding vote on Joseph and Archie, however, he insists they end their arguing and share a room. So they make up, and Joseph moves into the same room as Archie.

In "SorryNotSorry", when Sasha is set to leave the 'Dumping Ground' and move back in with her mum and family, Dexter comes back to say goodbye to everyone before leaving properly. As Dexter used to share a room with Archie, he grows jealous and feels left out when seeing Joseph sharing the room with Archie now.

In "Cat's in the Cradle", Archie purchases a load of carrots from the local market as they were on offer and he believed it to be a really good deal. His plan was to buy the carrots at the cheap price, and to sell the carrots and make a profit. May-Li wasn't happy with the amount of carrots Archie bought and wanted them out of the kitchen. Archie struggled to sell the carrots as no one was interested. Joseph decided to help Archie by suggesting them to make carrot ice cream. They scrapped this plan when they tasted the ice cream and were disgusted with the taste. May-Li felt a little bad for Archie, and decided to give him £1 so it didn't feel like he'd wasted his money, but she made him promise not to spend it unless it's absolutely necessary. But May-Li later finds Archie hiding a bunch of parsnips under his bed sheets, so it was clear he hadn't learnt his lesson.

In "Challenging Times", Ashdene Ridge were going up against another care home, Graybridge, in a competition to win a trip to London. In the quiz section, one of the tasks was to remember what objects appeared in a video showed to them. Joseph and Archie starred in the video, reancting and spoofing the popular sci-fi programme Doctor Who. Archie played the role of a Cyberman whilst Joseph played the role as The Doctor. (Joseph seemed to be dressed as Matt Smith's incarnation of The Doctor).

In "Utopia", May-Li mentions that Archie is away meeting some potential foster parents, and he does not return to the show after this.

Candi-Rose

Candi-Rose (real name Courtney), portrayed by Carma Hylton, made her first appearance on 3 February 2017 in series 5 of The Dumping Ground during the episode "The Fairytale Princess". Candi-Rose is known for her girliness, similar to Carmen Howle, also she likes pink and the world of fashion. She has also shown to be quite air-headed, also like Carmen in Tracy Beaker Returns. As soon as she arrived in the 'DG', she tells the other children that she is in care because her Dad works for the RAF and her Mum is a make-up artist who works on films, however it is suspected that this isn't true, as Candi later on in the episode "The Fairytale Princess" she says her Mum has worked for various singers although she previously said actors/actresses then says her Dad works in the navy but earlier she said to Chloe that her Dad worked in the RAF. Candi-Rose is introduced when she makes friends with Chloe. Later in Series 6B, she also made friends with Bird Wallis after he joined the cast in Series 6A. Her friendship with Chloe is quite similar with Carmen's friendship with Tee.

In "Sittin' in a Tree", Candi-Rose is shocked when she's told by the others that Jody and Tyler are just friends, as she thinks (as well as everyone else in the house) they're perfect for each other. Candi-Rose offers both Jody and Tyler advice about love. Helping Tyler how to deal with asking a girl for her number, and helping Jody figure out her feelings towards Tyler after she deliberately messes things up for Tyler and the girl he likes. Jody makes it clear that her and Tyler is just friends. But Candi-Rose is still convinced that Jody wants to be more than just friends with Tyler at some point in the future.

In "Faking It", Candi-Rose competes with Floss in "Faking It" for a role in a TV advert and sabotages Floss by gluing Floss' shoes to the floor, stopping her clock and stealing a scrapbook of Floss' mum. But she later feels guilty and owns up, Floss later forgives her after telling Candi-Rose that she's rubbish at everything. Floss then persuades the director in charge of the advert to allow Candi-Rose to play a part in the advert as Floss' friend.

In "Making Waves", when a new resident (Taz) is due to arrive, Mike and May-Li thought it best for some of the residents to go out for the day so Taz wouldn't be too overwhelmed on her first day. Sasha was originally having a trip to the beach just for her, but much to Sasha annoyance, Mike invited half of the kids along on the trip. (Tyler, Ryan, Candi-Rose, Finn, Dexter, Joseph and Archie). When they arrive at the beach, Mike splits the kids up into teams with various tasks. Mike teamed Candi-Rose with Sasha (again, much to Sasha's annoyance as the girls are the complete opposite in personality) to build a sand sculpture. Candi-Rose was much more enthusiastic than usual as she had never had a trip to the beach before. Candi-Rose and Sasha start getting along while they make an octopus sand sculpture. When they finish it Candi-Rose suggests for them to take a selfie in-front of the sculpture. But when Tyler and Ryan arrive, Ryan starts to tease Sasha by saying she's starting to turn all pink and girly. Sasha doesn't take it well and starts to lash out at Candi-Rose and destroy their sand sculpture. This upsets Candi-Rose and causes her to run off crying. Sasha starts to feel bad and panics when she can't find Candi-Rose. She goes to ask Tyler and Ryan to help look for her, Ryan doesn't move but Tyler helps Sasha look for Candi-Rose. Sasha and Tyler follow footsteps that follow to the sea, and end up finding her phone on the floor. They go to Mike to tell him that Sasha lost Candi-Rose, but before they tell Mike, Candi-Rose appears looking for her phone and much to everyone's shock, Sasha immediately hugs Candi-Rose after thinking she'd lost her.

In "The Phantom of Ashdene Ridge", when Candi-Rose and Chloe are hiding from what they think is a ghost. Candi-Rose mentions that she and her Sister used to hide under their bed whenever they heard footsteps coming up the stairs. It's assumed that they were abused in the past. "Candi-Rose?" also reveals that her real name is Courtney and that she has an older sister named Lauren who are kept separated to avoid being found by their parents. Her favourite beauty blogger is Savannah B, and she wins a competition in Series 8B which sees Savannah come to Ashdene Ridge and meet her.

In "The Real Candi-Rose", Candi-Rose's real name is overheard by Sabrina, who desperately tries to figure out who Courtney is and she ends up posting online asking about a Courtney at Ashdene Ridge. While the kids are originally able to convince Sabrina that Courtney is a ghost, it's revealed in "The Hardest Word" that Candi-Rose's parents were able to track her down thanks to that post. Candi-Rose's mum lies to her that she's changed but it is revealed to be a lie to get her lured away by her dad but thankfully, Jay is able to help Candi-Rose get away and then May-Li and Doreen are able to evade Candi-Rose's parents. Unfortunately, because of Candi-Rose's name being exposed and her parents knowing where she is, she is forced to leave the Dumping Ground to be moved to another care home with a new identity but May-Li convinces her that Candi-Rose will be fine.

Alex Walker

Alex Walker, played by Connor Lawson, made his first appearance on 3 March 2017 in series 5 of The Dumping Ground during the episode "Belief".

Alex is quite a hot-tempered boy who hasn't had the best start in life. From finding himself living on the streets from just 12 years old, Alex has learnt to take care of himself and finds it hard to listen to authority. He is shown to be gentle and sensitive at times, particularly to those he cares about. He respects Mike and he takes a particular liking to Floss soon becoming her best friend for a short time, in spite of his "tough" exterior. He prefers to be alone and sometimes aloof yet he is strongly caring and has a strong sense of integrity; he doesn't like opening up or feeling vulnerable, as he opens up his feelings to Finn and Charlie.

Background
Before being placed into the care system, Alex used to live with his mother, Aileen Peters. At the time, Aileen was very poor, and found it hard to find the money to take care of herself and Alex. One day, when Alex was just 5 years old, Aileen took Alex out for a drive, got him a comic and bottle of pop. But then she left on the street outside his dad's workplace and drove off without him, leaving him alone on the street. She felt like she was doing the right thing for Alex at the time, and thought she was protecting him, but any stranger could've just taken Alex. Alex ended up living with his dad, but he was never around, he'd either be at work or would just go away for days. And eventually, Alex was put into care. Alex ended up running away from his care homes a lot, and at just 12 years old, he found himself homeless and living on the streets. Cold, alone, frightened and hungry, Alex learnt quickly to take care of himself as everyone else in his life so far that he'd ever trusted has left him and felt like everyone who just pretends to care just goes. Alex spent about 2 years of the street and ended up becoming friends with an old man, who was also homeless, called George. George described Alex as being the grandson he never had, and they both promised to look out for each other through thick and thin.

Series 5
In his first episode "Belief", Alex is still living homeless on the streets and frequently gets donations from Kazima Tako, who feels sorry for him since she once lived on the street and knows what it's like, but one day runs off with her shopping bags and it is discovered he lives in a squat on his own. When Kazima convinces him to come back to the 'DG' for some food, he steals the residents of the 'Dumping Ground's' belongings but they get them back at the end of the episode. He refuses help from Ashdene Ridge and Kazima and ultimately stays on his own.

In "Free", Alex returns to the 'DG' seeking help from Kazima since his friend, George is ill. And the squat they were both living in had been boarded up by the council, leaving them with nowhere to go. Kazima manages to hide them both in the attic for a bit and gives them food until May-Li finds out what's going on. Alex ends up staying at Ashdene Ridge after George tries to run away without Alex, and when Alex caught up with him, George shouted at him, telling him that he's trying to get away from him. And that he made the pact with Alex to suit himself, but now that it doesn't, he doesn't want Alex around anymore. He tells Alex to get lost but confesses to Kazima when Alex is taken back to Ashdene Ridge by May-Li and Tyler, that he didn't mean a word of what he just said, and just wanted to give Alex the best chance he had.

Alex wasn't a very popular person in the 'Dumping Ground', to begin with, as he is already known as a thief by the others and he has many angry outbursts, especially when Kazima announced she was leaving to live with her dad in Denmark and Kazima was the only person in Ashdene Ridge that liked Alex, although Tyler had promised Kazima he'd look out for Alex. Even though Alex isn't close to Tyler often or hangs out with him, but he does eventually settle in and hangs out and becomes friends with Finn, Charlie and sometimes Jody. He also develops a strong rivalry with Ryan, although Ryan tried to stop Alex from egging the Mayor and Mr Umbelby.

Series 6

In the episode "Cats in the Cradle",  Alex and Charlie go round people's houses offering to do gardening. Alex sees a woman he recognises as his mum. He walks out of the job because of this, still angry at his mum's disappearance but he later meets his half-sister, Alice. Alex hears from Alice that his mum won a trophy and got rich. Alex is angry that his mum never came back for him but doesn't reveal himself to Alice or Aileen, not wanting to ruin their lives.

In episode 20, Alex uses his talent for cooking to get a job at Lily Kettle's cafe but working there doesn't go quite to plan as Ryan tries to sabotage it, making Alex rub avocado on Ryan's face. However, despite what had happened at the cafe, Lily visits the 'Dumping Ground' and tells Alex that he has got the job and Ryan finds himself being barred from the cafe.

Series 7

In episode 3, Alex reveals himself to Aileen and Mike arranges for them to meet in a park. Alex gets very angry with his mum for leaving him homeless but eventually agrees to go on visits to see his mum.

In episode 16, just before Charlie leaves, he and Charlie realize they're in love. This nearly makes Charlie want to stay but Charlie goes anyway.

In Episode 23, he leaves the 'DG' to live with his mum and to work at Lily's cafe.

He makes a guest appearance in series 8 episode "Risk", where he was spending his time with Finn, who wants to live with Alex as he said that Finn is always welcome.

Taz De Souza

Tasmin "Taz" De Souza, played by Jasmine Uson, made her first appearance on 20 October 2017 in series 5 of The Dumping Ground during the episode "Making Waves". Taz is a lot like how Jody was when she arrived at the 'Dumping Ground'. In series 5 Episode 20, when news breaks out that Mike and May-li have fought and May-li is leaving, she burst into tears and clings to May-li. This is supposedly what changed May-li mind into staying at the 'DG'. In "Cat's in the Cradles" Mike want to sell the old piano because it's old but Taz refused to as she reveals in the end her mum and dad has taught her how to play the piano and she also mentioned that her dad stopped playing the piano as her mum died and its shows that she misses her parents and her dad put her into care because he couldn't cope raising Taz alone and in the end Tyler, Jody and Floss supported Taz to keep the piano as it changes Mike's mind  because Taz is shown as a pianist. She is of Filipino descent.

Gradually in the first half of Series 7, she makes friends with Sid.

In Series 7 Episode 15, her Dad moves nearby and May-Li takes Taz to visit him. Taz hopes she can go on regular day visits to visit him but she overhears Mike and May-Li talk about whether they should actually let her. Taz then goes to lengths to impress Mike and May-Li so she can regularly go to see him.

In Series 7 Episode 23, Katy arrives at the 'DG'. Taz and Katy are made to share rooms which neither one is happy about. However, Taz and Katy eventually make friends in the first few episodes of Series 8 after arguing a lot.

Charlie Morris

Charlotte "Charlie" Morris (also Lottie Morris), played by Emily Burnett, made her first appearance on 10 November 2017 in series 5 of The Dumping Ground during the episode "Mission Totally Possible".

Charlie arrives at the 'Dumping Ground' and gains permission to set up a den in the garden to watch wildlife, which Taz (Jasmine Uson) joins in with. Charlie and Jody (Kia Pegg) grow annoyed with Floss (Sarah Rayson) when she takes their spot cream and deodorant, but May-Li (Stacy Liu) reminds them that Floss is going through puberty, so Charlie and Jody make her a teenage survival kit. Charlie acts as judge in a kangaroo court when Jody and Joseph (Yousef Naseer) are suspected of stealing money. The young people are devastated when the 'Dumping Ground' is to be knocked down and Charlie works out what will happen to them, but the young people manage to prevent the 'Dumping Ground' being sold and celebrate Christmas.

In Series 6 Episode 3 “Give and Take”, Charlie decides to sell some of her things and Sasha (Annabelle Davis) suggests they make T-shirts to sell, but becomes annoyed with Jody and Finn (Ruben Reuter) helping her. Charlie tells Sasha that she needs money to pay for yoga for her grandfather that helped him when he fell, but he is no longer getting classes as his home has stopped paying. Sasha offers to help her write a letter to the council to continue the funding.

In Series 6 Episode 16 “Home”, Charlie's grandad (Henry Lawrence) visits Ashdene Ridge. Henry breaks the news to Charlie that his Doctors have told him he's not got long left to live. Charlie refuses to believe this at first, then decides she wants to move out of the DG and take care of her Grandad. But Henry lets her know he's ok when he is, and wants her to stay she is.

In Series 6 Episode 23 “To Have and Not to Hold”, Charlie's grandad passes away.

In Series 7 Episode 10 “A Mother’s Love”, Charlie goes with Mike to visit her mother, Melanie, in prison. She's later released from prison and moves into a hostel nearby. Around the same time, Charlie finds out Henry left his old house to her in his will.

In Series 7 Episode 16 "Letting Go", Charlie leaves Ashdene Ridge to travel around the world. On her last day at Ashdene Ridge, Alex gave Charlie a leaving gift; a beautiful journal. Alex then thanked Charlie for always being there for him, and for never giving up on him. Charlie goes on to say she'll miss him more than anyone else. She then leant in to either hug him, or just a kiss on the cheek, but Alex misread the situation and kissed her. Charlie, stunned at first at what had just happened just froze, Alex apologised and quickly left the room in a hurry. At the same time Sasha had come upstairs, shouting for Charlie. As she was going to clear out her grandad's house with May-Li, Sasha and Jody before leaving. When they arrived at the house, Sasha asked Charlie if what was wrong with Alex, as she saw him leave Charlie's room in a hurry. Charlie tried to cover up what happened and said he was just giving her a present, like a friendship gift between mates. But she kept stuttering whilst talking. Making it clear to Sasha that she was hiding something. Later on, Sasha practically cornered Charlie in the kitchen and demanded to know what was going on between Charlie and Alex. Charlie had no choice but to tell Sasha about the kiss, which seemed to come as a shock to Sasha. But she seemed excited about it. Sasha asked Charlie if she liked Alex, in a more than friends type of way. She said she'd never really thought about it before, but now maybe she did. Charlie decided to put her travelling plans on hold so she could stick around to spend more time with Alex. She seemed happy about her decision, but when she went back to her grandad's house (accompanied by Alex) she realised she had to go travelling. As it's what she truly wanted. Alex also felt the same, as he knew how much she wanted to go and it's what her grandad really wanted for her. But he promised he'd be waiting for her when she returned home. The two of them had one last big hug, and said they're goodbyes to each other. For now. Before she left for the airport, she recorded a video message for everyone else back at Ashdene Ridge, saying goodbye to them properly. Which she sent to Alex's phone so he could show everyone. Charlie said goodbye to everyone, telling Jody and Tyler to keep the rabble under control while she's away. Telling Bird to continue mixing his great tunes. Saying to Jay how she knows he'll be making a fortune by the time she gets back. Telling Floss to never change, as she's perfect the way she is. Letting Candi-Rose and Chloe know she'll miss their girly chats together. Taz to keep her Tasmanian Devil spirit. Sid to keep watching the skies. Letting Finn know she knows he'll be amazing at whatever he does. Telling Sasha how she cannot wait to see her artwork in a gallery someday. Telling May-Li it was an honour to bring her baby boy into the world with her, and that she'll never forget. And a last;y, she thanked Mike for everything he'd done for her. And asked him to do one thing for her, and to take care of Alex.

Bird Wallis

Noah "Bird" Wallis, played by Leo James, made his first appearance on 23 February 2018 in series 6 of The Dumping Ground during the episode "Challenging Times". Bird is shown to be quite a shy and reserved person who hardly ever talks. When he first arrives he always wore headphones. This may have been distance himself from difficult situations outside. Bird's younger brother "Jay" is a lot more talkative than Bird, and is very protective of Him. Jay mentioned that he and Bird have been in 10 different homes, and they both moved into the 'Dumping Ground' in the middle of the night. In the episode "Two Sides to Every Story", it's confirmed that Bird has diabetes. In the same episode, when Jay tells Mike and Fiona that May-Li hit him, Bird backs him up but later after talking to Sasha, he decided to tell the truth. Meaning May-Li was in the clear and wouldn't risk losing her job. Jay isn't happy with Bird after this, but they make up when Bird convinces Jay to give Ashdene Ridge a chance. Since Sasha told him that it's different to other places they've been, and so are Mike and May-Li. Him and Jay ater became good friends with Candi-Rose and Chloe. He is 2 years older than Jay.

In "Broken Record", after encountering their dad in public, Bird remained sceptical about his claims of having changed. His doubts were soon proven correct, after learning that their dad was actually homeless and wanted Jay to live with him, but not Bird. Bird later confronted him about this, only to be told that he was not actually his son.

In "My Greatest Composition", Bird believes that a famous musician named Femi is his real dad so he sets off to find him. After questioning Femi, he discovers that Femi never had any children but that his real father is Femi's brother, Nana. After the truth is revealed, Bird is invited by Nana to go on tour with him. In the following episode, Bird moves out of the Dumping Ground to go on tour with Nana.

Jay Wallis

Jacob "Jay" Wallis, played by Cole Wealleans-Watts, made his first appearance on 23 February 2018 in series 6 of The Dumping Ground during the episode "Challenging Times".

Jay is shown to be quite a tough character and is very protective of his quieter and shyer older brother, Bird. Jay mentioned that he and his brother have been in 10 different homes, and they both moved into the 'Dumping Ground' in the middle of the night. In the episode "Two Sides to Every Story", Jay becomes annoyed and feels threatened by May-Li when she introduces a new diet and exercise plan for Bird to help with his diabetes. And when May-Li tries to get Jay to take part in the diet to support his brother, he starts feeling threatened by May-Li as he doesn't like anyone else telling him or his brother what to do. He decides to lie to Mike telling him that May-Li hit him on the arm really hard. Mike's old friend and ex-girlfriend Fiona was in the office at the time and been as she was a care worker herself, she decided to take immediate action about this. As when a resident makes a serious accusation like this, it has to be taken seriously and fully investigated. Jay convinced Bird to back him up and lie as well, saying he witnessed May-Li hit his brother. Fiona and Mike talked to May-Li and explained that May-Li confronted Jay confused about why he was lying, but Fiona told May-Li to pack her things and go home while they deal with this. Mike tried to stop Fiona, as he believed May-Li and knew she'd never resort to violence with any of the kids in her care, but Fiona still told May-Li to pack her things. Floss overheard all this and told the others, which resorted to the YP getting angry and confronting Jay and Bird themselves. This turned into a bit of a fight which was stopped by Mike. Sasha later asked Jay and Bird to come to the attic, to tell them the whole story. Jay still stuck with his lies saying May-Li hit him, and Bird still backed him up. This was put to a stop again when Mike found everyone in the attic questioning Jay and Bird. Later, in the garden, Sasha decided to talk to Bird herself to get the truth out of him. Sasha told him to give Mike, May-Li and the 'DG' a chance and to tell the truth. Bird decided to tell the truth about the hitting, meaning May-Li was off the hook. Jay was not happy with Bird after this, as he felt betrayed. Later, Bird stopped Jay from running away and begged him to stay, as he was sick of fresh starts, new places and handout clothes. So Jay decided to stay and give Ashdene Ridge a chance.

Jay is shown to be incredibly smart as he does well academically. He applied for a place at a prestigious private school as he got a great result of 93% in an entrance exam. However, he got extremely upset when he didn't get it.

In "Trouble in Paradise", Jay and new boy Nazeer did not get along well. Their rivalry started when Nazeer already knew a "magic" trick that Jay was showing the rest of the 'DG', which turned out to be a prank. It escalated quickly when Jay called Sid weird and Nazeer got upset by this. He comforted Sid, which made Jay mad. The rivalry continued in "Go Your Own Way" when the 'DG' Olympics were held. Jay was made team captain of the "Top Dogs" and Sid was made team captain of the "Underdogs". Jay laughed at the fact Sid was team captain and said that winning would be a piece of cake. Sid eventually led his team to victory, upsetting Jay.

Jay is also known to be a skillful liar as he never tells the truth, this can upset Bird as he wants him to tell the truth. This is shown in "Moment of Truth" (Series 9 Episode 1).

Sid "Siddharth" Khan

Sid Khan, played by Josh Sangha, is a character introduced in the first episode of Series 7 of The Dumping Ground. He is of Indian heritage-with roots in Mauritius-and sometimes up to mischief and is very strange. He carries around a creepy doll and also has very eccentric clothing. He is a very interesting character with little backstory shown. He later makes friends with Taz and then Katy when Katy arrives at the 'DG'. He is very sad when May-Li resigns after the first episode of Series 8 of the 'Dumping Ground' and tries to find May-Li. It is unclear why Sid was initially put into care. But he told Jody that when he first arrived at his old care home, he ran away and found his doll, Fred, in a dumpster. He kept Fred because he felt like they were the same, as they were both unwanted. He has also talked about his aunt, who was his foster parent for a short amount of time. He used to help her do her makeup, and when he left her, she gave him a makeup mirror to remind him of her. 
In "Go Your Own Way", Jody gave him the Peter Pan book, which was passed onto different care kids when they leave care.
In Series 9, someone says that he and Fred performed on stage together but he lost him and he wants him back. Sid is reluctant to let Fred go, but does it anyway.

Bec Hyde

Rebecca "Bec" Hyde, played by Ava Potter, is first introduced in the 18th episode of the seventh series. She is seen as a difficult person when Sid and Taz want to introduce themselves. She seemed hard to talk to but it's revealed they know that Bec was both bullied and also treated 'like a skivvy' by her emotionally abusive grandmother, who took her in after her mother died. This created tension between her and the other residents, especially at the welcome meal, where she won't eat with the others. It is as if she doesn't want to be there.

Two episodes later, in the episode "Champions", it's revealed that she doesn't want any friends and she said this in front of Floss.

In the final episode of Series 7 ("The Last Dance"), she re-encountered a girl, Evie, who had previously bullied her. As Evie was picking on Floss at the time, she stuck up for Floss in front of Evie.

In Series 8, she reveals to Taz that it's her mother's death anniversary. Taz tells everyone this, making Bec very angry. Later on, a stray dog gets attached to her and follows her to Ashdene Ridge. Bec tries to hide the dog from May-Li and Scott.

In the second episode of Series 9, it was revealed by Candi-Rose that she moved back to live with her aunt. However, in episode 11, it was revealed that her aunt was ill and her gran had moved in a few months and has been abusing Bec again. When Ruby discovers this, Bec is taken back to Ashdene Ridge.

In the Series 9 finale, Bec meets a girl called Joy and starts to have feelings for her after spending some time with her. However, when she learns that Joy already has a boyfriend, she is upset and doesn't want to spend time with her. Jay gets her to open up and she reveals that she might like girls but is still figuring things out and that it is up to her to decide when she is ready to share. She also apologizes to Joy for her attitude and makes up with her.

Bec does not return in Series 10, presumably after going back to live with her aunt again off-screen, although it has not been officially confirmed.

Katy White

Katy White, was introduced in Series 7 Episode 23 "Mighty Mike Milligan". She took a lot of convincing to come and live at Ashdene Ridge and leave her Mum and tried to escape back to her Mum. She made friends with Taz and Sid in early Series 8. She is in care because her mother has a drinking problem.

Katy does not return for Series 10, presumably after having moved back in with her mum offscreen, although this has not been confirmed officially.

Scott Murray

Scott Murray, portrayed by Louis Payne, was a temperorary care worker introduced in Series 8 but then was made a permanent care worker at Ashdene Ridge by the end of episode 2. Floss discovers how good he is at scamming  in Series 8 Episode 4 and Taz gives Scott a hard time (in episode 7) when she escapes the 'DG' to go into the town centre and use her talent of piano playing to raise money as her Dad is running low on money. In Series 8 Episode 16, Scott and Viv volunteer at a food bank and he catches someone stealing food.

Scott does not return for Series 10, the reason is not discussed on-screen, and the character has not been referenced in Series 10, so far.

Viv

Viv, played by Chloe Lea, lived with her Uncle Ray but as her Uncle kept stealing things to afford rents, she was taken to a care home. She had been through at least two before coming to Ashdene Ridge.

Viv came to live at Ashdene Ridge in episode 5 of series 8 of the 'Dumping Ground'. In this episode, she meets Sasha and she and Sasha become competitive over general knowledge of some of the other YP at Ashdene Ridge.

In Series 8 Episode 10 ("Do the right thing"), Viv departed to go and live with her Uncle Ray again who had by this time changed. However, she soon discovered that her uncle was still stealing things as he had been fired from work and was struggling to pay rents. Annoyed, she returned to Ashdene Ridge. In Series 9, it is mentioned in the first episode by Jay that Viv has once again moved in with her uncle.
Viv is funny, competitive and friendly, and has a known passion for football - specifically Manchester United.

The actress did not return for Series 9 filming due to personal reasons and also filming another show at the time.

Nazeer

Nazeer, played by Tut Nuyot, lived with his Dad and they enjoyed making electric models together and people thought them as weird like people think Sid as weird at the 'DG'. This changed when Nazeer's stepmother came along. Nazeer was eventually taken into care.

Nazeer first appeared in episode 11 ("Trouble in Paradise") and Jay soon started to dislike Nazeer and tries to prove to Nazeer that he is in charge of the 'DG'. Jay is not nice to Sid while trying to prove this. Nazeer and Sid later become friends and Jay and Nazeer officially become enemies.

In "Great Expectations", May-Li mentions that he has moved back in with his dad.

Ruby Butler

Ruby Butler, played by Liv De-Vulgt, made her first appearance in the series 8 episode "Keeping Face", broadcast on 9 October 2020. Introduced as a guest character, she joined the main cast in the series 9 episode "Run, Rescue, Repeat", broadcast on 13 August 2021.

Ruby was placed into care after her mother (Nia Gwynne) was sent to prison for the accident which killed Bec Hyde's (Ava Potter) mother. She remained in care after her mother was released early due to her release conditions requiring her to avoid contact. She is placed into Ashdene Ridge temporarily and shares a room with Bec. The pair begin to strike up a friendship until Bec learned of her mother's identity. Enraged at her early release, Bec tricks Ruby into going to see her mother so as to send her back to prison for breaching her release conditions. May-Li (Stacy Liu), having learned the truth about the pair, arrives, but Bec's conscience gets the better of her and she changes her mind about calling the police. Ruby is subsequently moved to a different care home.

At some point Ruby returns to live with her mum, but her struggles to adjust lead to Ruby returning to Ashdene Ridge. With Bec now gone, Ruby tries too hard to fit in, claiming to like everything the others say they do despite having no knowledge of most of it. After getting tricked by Clem (Halle Cassell), Ruby admits she copied everyone because she didn't fit in at her last home, with everyone there considering her weird. May-Li encourages her to open up, which she does.

In episode 11, she decides to visit Bec to thank her for how things are going with her and her mum but she discovers that Bec is living rough at her aunt's farm because her aunt is ill and her gran has moved in and has been abusing Bec. Thanks to Sasha, Scott is able to find out and rescue Bec from her situation.

Ruby does not return for Series 10, most likely having returned to live with her mum.

Max Riley

Max Riley, played by Jed Jefferson, made his first appearance in episode 16 ("Everybody Needs a Friend") as a new roommate and friend for Sid. It is mentioned in "Sasha Claus" that his parents would fight a lot but Christmas is a day that would bring them together. However, in Series 9, his dad gives him a video game and towards the end of the series, Max goes to stay with him for a bit.

He doesn't return for Series 10, most likely now staying with his dad. The actor confirmed on Twitter that he would not return and was filming another drama, also airing on CBBC.

Clem Stephens

Clem Stephens, played by Halle Cassell, made her first appearance in series 9 episode 6 ("Partners in Crime"). In episode 11 of Series 9, it was revealed that she is used to moving around a lot and she has an older sister named Nicole with her own flat.

Kyle Lavan

Kyle Lavan, played by Freddy Smith, made his first appearance in series 9 episode 15 ("The Beat Goes On").

Ben

Ben, played by William Wyn Davies, made his first appearance in series 10 episode 1 ("A Whole New Start") and is the replacement care worker of Scott.

Bonnie Vasiliou

Bonnie Vasiliou, played by Lara Mehmet, made her first appearance in series 10 episode 1 ("A Whole New Start"). She’s the older sister of Fraser Vasiliou.

Fraser Vasiliou

Fraser Vasiliou, played by Massimo Cull, made his first appearance in series 10 episode 1 ("A Whole New Start"). He’s the younger brother of Bonnie Vasiliou.

Sabrina Moxley

Sabrina Moxley, played by Florrie Wilkinson, made her first appearance in series 10 episode 1 ("A Whole New Start").

Hugo Little

Hugo Little, played by Hugo Nash, made his first appearance in series 10 episode 1 ("A Whole New Start"). Hugo owns a treasured teddy bear named “Little Hug”.

Wes Oldfield

Wes Oldfield, played by Owen Phillips, made his first appearance in series 10 episode 1 ("A Whole New Start").

Doreen

Doreen, played by Andrea Hall, made her first appearance in series 10 episode 1 ("A Whole New Start"). She was the head care worker at Bridley Hill and May-Li’s former boss.

Guest characters

Kingsley Jackson

Kingsley Jackson, portrayed by David Avery, made his first appearance on 18 January 2013 in series 1 of The Dumping Ground during the episode "S.O.S.".

When Jody (Kia Pegg) moves back home to Kingsley, their mother Denise (Victoria Alcock) and brother Luke (James Bartlett), Gina visits Jody with Carmen (Amy-Leigh Hickman) and Tyler (Miles Butler-Houghton). When Gina, Carmen and Tyler leave, Denise and Kingsley don't want Jody's friends visiting. Jody runs away to The Dumping Ground, giving the others presents and Mike (Connor Byrne) arranges for Jody to stay the night and for their social worker, Rob (Neil Armstrong) to sort things out the following day. Kingsley and Denise arrive the following day to collect Jody and she reluctantly agrees to go back. Jody tells the others she needs the presents back as they belong to Kingsley, who has no idea she has got them. Carmen, Tyler, Tee (Mia McKenna-Bruce) and Lily (Jessie Williams) go to Jody's when Carmen is unable to get hold of Jody on a mobile she gave her. Carmen and Tyler sneak into the house and go to Jody's room, which is filled with stolen, expensive goods. When Kingsley arrives home, Carmen and Tyler hide in Jody's room and Kingsley is angry when he finds the door unlocked and Carmen's mobile phone, thinking it's Jody's and he locks Jody in her bedroom. Tee sends Elektra (Jessica Revell) a video of Tyler sending a Morse code for Gus (Noah Marullo) to work out. Gus works out they are saying "S.O.S". When Kingsley finds out Carmen and Tyler have been with Jody the whole time, he threatens them to stay quiet. Gina arrives and she is angry with Denise for not protecting Jody and Jody returns for The Dumping Ground.

With Kingsley's trial coming up, Denise doesn't want Jody to testify, but after dreaming about being in Alice's Adventures in Wonderland, Jody decides to testify against Kingsley.

Jody is pleased to see Kingsley when he moves into his new flat and Kingsley reassures Jody that going to prison wasn't her fault. Kingsley introduces her to his girlfriend, Rosie (Zoe Iqbal) and Jody lets them sell Mike's carriage clock when Kingsley owes money to a gang. Kingsley tells Jody to leave the door open at The Dumping Ground open, so he and Rosie can steal things. Jody is trapped in a fire at Kingsley's flat and Kingsley runs off when he finds out. Jody later confronts Kingsley after finding out that he didn't even try to help save her from the fire, Rosie overhears the conversation and is not impressed with Kingsley's actions and give Jody back Mike carriage clock and confesses everything to Jody. And that there was never a gang wanting money from Kingsley and that it was all a trick to sell the stuff Jody stole, so Kingsley and Rosie could sell the stuff. Rosie breaks up with Kingsley after telling Jody all this.

Years later, Jody finds out that Kingsley was killed in a car accident and struggles to move on from the situation. With the help from Tyler, she is able to get her own closure about Kingsley and is able to move on from his abuse.

Denise Jackson

Denise Jackson, portrayed by Victoria Alcock, made her first appearance on 18 January 2013 in series 1 of The Dumping Ground during the episode "S.O.S.". She is Jody's emotionally abusive mother.

When Jody (Kia Pegg) moves back home to Denise and her brothers, Kingsley (David Avery) and Luke (James Bartlett), Gina (Kay Purcell) visits Jody with Carmen (Amy-Leigh Hickman) and Tyler (Miles Butler-Houghton). When Gina, Carmen and Tyler leave, Denise and Kingsley don't want Jody's friends visiting. Jody runs away to The Dumping Ground, giving the others presents and Mike (Connor Byrne) arranges for Jody to stay the night and for their social worker, Rob (Neil Armstrong) to sort things out the following day. Kingsley and Denise arrive the following day to collect Jody and she reluctantly agrees to go back. Jody tells the others she needs the presents back as they belong to Kingsley, who has no idea she has got them. Carmen, Tyler, Tee (Mia McKenna-Bruce) and Lily (Jessie Williams) go to Jody's when Carmen is unable to get hold of Jody on a mobile she gave her. Carmen and Tyler sneak into the house and go to Jody's room, which is filled with stolen, expensive goods. When Kingsley arrives home, Carmen and Tyler hide in Jody's room and Kingsley is angry when he finds the door unlocked and Carmen's mobile phone, thinking it's Jody's and he locks Jody in her bedroom. Tee sends Elektra (Jessica Revell) a video of Tyler sending a Morse code for Gus (Noah Marullo) to work out. Gus works out they are saying "S.O.S". When Kingsley finds out Carmen and Tyler have been with Jody the whole time, he threatens them to stay quiet. Gina arrives and she is furious with Denise for not protecting Jody from Kingsley, as Denise was meant to be the parent. And what made Gina even more angry was that Denise knew what Kingsley was doing to Jody and never said anything. Luke convinces his mum that the Dumping Ground is the best place for Jody as she is better off with Mike and Gina, and Jody returns for The Dumping Ground.

With Kingsley's trial coming up, Denise doesn't want Jody to testify, but after dreaming about being in Alice's Adventures in Wonderland, Jody decides to testify against Kingsley, angering Denise. Denise ended up running away, scared of how Kingsley would react to her other children betraying Kingsley.

In Series 3, Denise doesn't appear but is mentioned on numerous occasions. In "Coming Round" when May-Li's grandmother PoPo came to visit, Jody bonded with her a lot, and confided in her about her family past. And that she was sad that her mother was ignoring her after she testified against Kingsley in court, and expressed how she felt about her mum and the way she treated Jody. PoPo suggested for Jody to write a letter to her mum, explaining her how she feels about her mum and what she would really want to say to her, and for when she'd finished writing the letter to fold it up and put in a draw or box somewhere and forget about it. So she would've gotten her feelings out without actually saying them to her. But at the time, Jody and Ryan Reeves were having a rivalry and as Ryan overheard one of Jody and PoPo's conversations, went into Jody's room to find the letter she wrote to her mum to get her feelings out. Ryan ended up posting the letter through a letter box round the corner, but luckily Jody asked her older brother Luke to not let her mum see the letter.

Denise Jackson is set to appear in the opener episode of Series 6 of The Dumping Ground, called "Jody on Ropes".

Jimmy Wharton

Jimmy Wharton, portrayed by Mark Theodore, made his first appearance on 10 January 2014 in series 2 of The Dumping Ground during the episode "Quitters - Booting Up: Part 2".

Jimmy is the father of Bailey (Kasey McKellar). When Jimmy attempts to take Bailey from The Dumping Ground, Mike (Connor Byrne) and May-Li Wang (Stacy Liu) inform Jimmy that they are legally responsible for Bailey. Inside, Mike and May-Li tell Jimmy he'll have to contact Social Services about getting Bailey back, but Jimmy devastates Bailey when he says that he wasn't expecting to get Bailey back straight away. Bailey runs away to his dad and they go to a football match, however, Jimmy is chucked out of the match by a police officer (Jon Regan). So he doesn't get in trouble, when Jody (Kia Pegg) mentions to the police officer that Jimmy abducted his kid, Jimmy lies that he doesn't have a child, hurting Bailey. Jimmy arrives at The Dumping Ground when he finds out Bailey has seen his mother, Alison and Jimmy and Bailey both find Alison gone from The Dumping Ground. When they find her, Jimmy reveals that Alison is not his mum, but her friend Briony. Bailey later makes amends with Jimmy.

Sally Lewis

Sally Lewis, portrayed by Diveen Henry, made her first appearance on 7 February 2014 in series 2 of The Dumping Ground during the episode "Holding On".

May-Li (Stacy Liu) supervises a day out between Sally and Tyler (Miles Butler-Houghton) at the park. Sally takes Tyler and they sneak away from the park. Sally gets some ice cream, however, she has no money to pay, so she runs away without paying. A community support officer intercepts Sally. May-Li eventually finds Sally and Tyler and she pays for the ice cream. When Tyler finds out Sally hasn't been taking her bipolar medication, he asks May-Li to take him home. Back at The Dumping Ground, Sally and Tyler wait in the quiet room, however, Sally disappears and she locks herself in the bathroom and Tyler gets her to open the door. Sally promises Tyler things will get better.

On a fostering information day, Tyler gets close to a foster parent, Mrs Underwood (Martina Laird) and she is hurt. When Tyler asks his mum if he has to turn down every potential foster family, Sally decides that he doesn't as he needs to be in the best place for him.

Tyler is delighted when Sally wants him back and he visits his mum for a meeting with his social worker. Sally shows Tyler his room, which Tyler doesn't like as it's dinosaur themed. Tyler goes between his birthday party at The Dumping Ground and his mum's and Tyler snaps when his mum replaces a photo of the young people with one of them both. Sally and Tyler realise the need to get to know each other and Sally accepts the young people and staff are family too.

Lucy Taylor

Lucy Taylor, portrayed by Sally Rogers, made her first appearance on 21 March 2014 in series 2 of The Dumping Ground during the episode "Holding On". She departed in series 3 during the episode "Dragon Slayer".

Tee (Mia McKenna-Bruce) receives a letter from Lucy and she arranges to meet her at a cafe and Lucy apologises to Tee for letting her down. Tee visits her mum at a women's refuge she is staying at and when Lucy says she wants to introduce her to someone, Tee suspects it is a boyfriend and leaves, however, Lucy goes after Tee and introduces Tee to her half-sister, Hope (Lucy Briggs). Johnny (Joe Maw) goes to find Tee and he meets Hope, but he is angry with Lucy about everything that has happened. Feeling that Hope isn't safe with Lucy, Tee takes Hope whilst Lucy is distracted and takes her to The Dumping Ground before pretending to Mike (Connor Byrne) she is an abandoned child. A frantic Lucy turns up at The Dumping Ground to collect Hope and Mike realises that Hope is Johnny and Tee's sister.

Johnny spots his stepfather, Keith (Neil Morrissey), in a park and rushes to tell his mum, but he and Tee are shocked to learn that she knows and that he has been seeing Hope (now Holly & Paige Robinson). When Johnny goes to see his mum, Keith answers the door and Lucy arrives home shortly after. Keith pretends to be friendly toward Johnny, inviting him in, but when Lucy goes in, Keith is horrid to Johnny. Lucy tells Johnny and Tee that Keith won't be staying around as he is moving to Scotland and Johnny tells his mum that she has to think who really matters. Keith visits The Dumping Ground and complains to Mike about Johnny, accusing him of harassment. When Johnny shows his mum the photos, Lucy thinks it is drug dealing, but Keith shows him some drug counselling cards he has been handing out. Keith threatens to phone the police, but Lucy talks him out of it and Lucy agrees to let Keith stay so he can get to know Hope. On the day he is due to leave for the Army, Johnny goes to see his mum, but he finds her with a massive bruise on her face. Johnny gets his mum out of the house and confronts Keith.

Kelly Bellman

Kelly Bellman, portrayed by Sandy Foster, made her first appearance on 13 October 2015 in series 3 of The Dumping Ground during the episode "free to Good Home".

After catching Dexter (Alexander Aze) trying to shoplift, Sasha (Annabelle Davis) goes home and Murphy (Thomas and Oliver Waldram) is all alone. When Kelly returns home, she tells Sasha that she has had a call from a social worker about her running off, but won't tell. Sasha tells her mum that she caught Dexter trying to shoplift some nappies and that she needs to be there for her brothers. When Kelly hints on about being skint, Sasha tells her that she can't help her anymore.

When Sasha comes home after going to the park with Dexter and his friend, Kelly tells Sasha she is managing with Dexter and Murphy (Fred Montgomery Scott), but having her back would be a risk. Sasha is delighted when Kelly announces she is pregnant with her new partner's daughter, but is left upset when Kelly says it wouldn't work with Sasha living at home. Kelly's daughter is born with dwarfism, like Sasha. When Sasha finds out her stepbrother, Roddy (Alfie Browne-Sykes), is involving Dexter in burglaries, she finds Dexter in a building with stolen things and that Kelly is involved. Dexter moves back with Kelly and Kev, but Sasha chooses to remain at The Dumping Ground.

Peter and Janet Umbleby

Peter Umbleby, portrayed by Simon Ludders, and Janet Umbleby, played by Alison Pargeter, made their first appearance on 20 January 2017 in series 5 of The Dumping Ground during the episode "Miscreants, Robots and Bullies".

Peter and Janet are the parents of Edward (Jaimie Boubezari), and Peter is a snobby, arrogant and overbearing man. The young people are mistaken for Mike Milligan and May-Li Wang's children, but they tell the Umbleby's they are a children's home. Floss Guppy (Sarah Rayson) tells Peter and Janet about the young people's lives and the Umbleby's tell them to leave. Edward helps Kazima Tako (Akuc Bol), Toni Trent (Nelly Currant) and Billie Trent (Gwen Currant) leave his house when they return a doll and when Archie Able (Jethro Beliba) and Joseph Stubbs (Yousef Naseer) are caught in their garden accused of being intruders, Edward blames Kazima, Toni and Billie. Edward crashes his drone into Kazima's cake and Edward has to help Kazima bake another one. She decides to help Edward stand up to his father and Mr Umbleby is annoyed with Edward spending time with Kazima and playing his guitar. Kazima offers Edward's parents to stay away from him and Edward gets his guitar back. Ryan (Lewis Hamilton) and Dexter (Alexander Aze) spot Peter in the park putting a notice about a public meeting to close the skate park and Chloe (Hannah Moncur) suggests they go to the meeting about the skate park. At the meeting, Mr Umbleby undermines the young people and the other young people start hitting pots and pans, but Chloe stops them and explains what the skate park means to them.

Mike comes across a letter from a development firm in the garden and everyone is horrified to learn that they are planning to knock The Dumping Ground down and build flats. After a visit to the council, Mike and Tyler (Miles Butler-Houghton) tell everyone the decision was taken to close The Dumping Ground was down to money. When there's a visit by the mayor, Ryan borrows Mike's MBE to help keep The Dumping Ground open, but Alex (Connor Lawson) eggs the Mayor and Peter. The Dumping Ground appears on the news and Mike is horrified that Peter is head of building planning and Janet exaggerates the young people's behaviour. Peter later reveals that the sale has been brought forward to the following day due to the management of The Dumping Ground. Elektra (Jessica Revell) returns to The Dumping Ground and greets everyone before sarcastically insulting the Umblebys. The Umblebys receive an email about the sale being put on hold due to the reports of Roman remains on the site, which the young people, Mike and May-Li are delighted about. Peter comes across Frank (Chris Slater) at the council whilst trying to find the boss, but Frank tells him his boss is away and is working on the site report. Elektra emerges when Peter leaves, impressed with how things are going. Alex overhears Peter and Janet discussing their own hired archaeological expert, who he will bribe with money to get his own way. Frank and Tyler look into Peter's plans when their archaeological plan flans and realise that Peter and Janet will gain a luxury house for the development. Janet returns the stolen money to Tyler and the theft was arranged by Peter. Janet tells Tyler that she wants to remain where she is and Tyler gets Frank to search something. Mike tricks Peter inside and the young people tell him they know he is getting a new house and Peter gives in.

Aileen Peters

Aileen Peters, portrayed by Dani Arlington, made her first appearance on 16 February 2018 in series 6 of The Dumping Ground during the episode "Cat's in the Cradle".

Aileen is the mother of Alex Walker. Aileen used to be very poor when she gave birth to Alex, and when Alex was just 5 years old, Aileen left Alex out on the street outside the workplace of Alex's father and drove off. As she had no job or money, and could barely feed herself, let alone a child. Aileen was eventually offered a job in business, and as the years went on she became a very successful business woman. Aileen managed to make something of her life and went from rags to riches. She even ended up winning an award for "Business Woman of the Year". Whilst she was building up her career and earning money, she got married and had a daughter called Alice. But she never forgot about Alex, and spent years trying to track Alex down. But every place she got in contact with told her that Alex had moved on somewhere else, not knowing that her son had really runaway and was living on the streets at just 12 years old.

Alice Peters

Alice Peters, portrayed by Isla McMonigle, made her first appearance on 16 February 2018 in series 6, episode 6 of The Dumping Ground during the episode "Cat's in the Cradle".

Alice is the half-sister of Alex Walker.

Fiona Johnson

Fiona Johnson, portrayed by Michelle Collins, made her first appearance on 23 February 2018 in series 6 of The Dumping Ground during the episode "Challenging Times".

Fiona is the Wife of Mike Milligan. During their young adult years, they were boyfriend and girlfriend. However she dumped Mike, breaking his heart, as after a few months of dating as she felt like she needed someone different in her life. She came back into Mike's life quite a few years later- when the care home she was working at were going up against Ashdene Ridge in a competition to win a trip to London. This reopened old wounds for Mike, reminding him how much he loved Fiona, and how sad and heartbroken he was when she dumped him. In the episode "Two Sides to Every Story", Fiona came round again to film a video with Mike for Sasha about the competition of Ashdene Ridge vs Graybridge. Candi-Rose noticed chemistry between Mike and Fiona, and went on a mission to find out more about Fiona, and to pair them up again . She was successful as they agreed to meet up for a coffee. In "The Lurgy", when Mike was ill he kept ringing Fiona asking her to pick up some stuff from the chemist. And it was clear they had become an item again as he referred Fiona as "love" and "babe".

Mike proposed to Fiona off-screen during the 19th episode of Series 6, "Jay and Bird's Day" and she accepted.

Fiona and Mike got married in the 24th episode of Series 6, "Missing Presumed Single". Fiona never invited any of her friends or family to their wedding for an unknown reason.

Henry Lawrence

Henry Lawrence, portrayed by Louis Mahoney, made his first appearance on 5 October 2018 in series 6 of The Dumping Ground during the episode "Home".

Henry was the Grandfather of Charlie Morris until his death which was mentioned in "Missing Presumed Single"

Ross Maydons

Ross Maydons, portrayed by William Talbot, made his first appearance on 5 October 2018 in series 6 of The Dumping Ground during the episode "Home". He made his second appearance in series 7 during the episode "The Return of the Freaky Twins". In "Nobody's Perfect", it was revealed from a DNA test that Ross is Floss' brother.

Others

Series 1 (2013)

Series 2 (2014)

Series 3 (2015)

Series 4 (2016)

Series 5 (2017)

See also
 List of The Story of Tracy Beaker (franchise) characters
 List of The Story of Tracy Beaker characters
 List of Tracy Beaker Returns characters

References

External links

Children's television characters by series
Lists of British television series characters